= All Ghillied Up =

Level from Call of Duty 4: Modern Warfare

- The player is forced to hide prone in long grass whilst a platoon passes by. The section was praised by critics for its tension.
- First appearance: Call of Duty 4: Modern Warfare (2007)
- Last appearance: Call of Duty: Modern Warfare Remastered (2016)
- Created by: Mohammad Alavi
- Genre: First-person shooter, stealth

In-universe information
- Location: Pripyat, Ukraine
- Characters: Lieutenant Price, Captain MacMillan

"All Ghillied Up" is a level in the 2007 first-person shooter video game Call of Duty 4: Modern Warfare and its 2016 remastered version, Call of Duty: Modern Warfare Remastered. Set in Pripyat, Ukraine in 1996, the player assumes control of then Lieutenant John Price and is assisted by their superior Captain MacMillan. The pair make their way through Pripyat covertly with the objective of assassinating the game's primary antagonist, Imran Zakhaev. The player may deal with enemies stealthily, overtly, or avoid engaging them altogether.

The name refers to the ghillie suits worn by Price and MacMillan in the mission. It was designed by Mohammad Alavi initially in secret due to the difficulty of explaining its intricacies to the artificial intelligence (AI) programmer. It took Alavi three months and more than 10,000 lines of code to make the first minute of gameplay for the level. "All Ghillied Up" was praised for its atmosphere, pacing, and freedom of choice, and has since been considered by critics to be one of the greatest levels in video game history.

== Level content ==
"All Ghillied Up" is the thirteenth level in Call of Duty 4: Modern Warfare's single-player campaign. Set in an irradiated wasteland of the Chernobyl Exclusion Zone 10 years after the Chernobyl Disaster, the player's character, with the assistance of a non-player character (NPC) companion, proceeds through a shack within a field, past a house, and through an abandoned church whilst taking out enemies. The player proceeds to another field where they encounter a platoon with BMP-2 infantry fighting vehicles advancing across it, and hide from the enemies in the foliage using their ghillie suits in prone. They encounter another platoon with a helicopter and military vehicles, and must crawl under a series of these vehicles to avoid detection. They enter Pripyat and eventually reach the abandoned Polissya hotel to prepare for an assassination attempt.

At the time of its release, the level was the first in the series where NPCs could react differently based on the players' behavior like those seen in stealth video games. This allows NPCs to react differently based on whether they can detect the player. Throughout the level, the player is presented with numerous choices, to which MacMillan responds appropriately. Near the start of the level, once the player passes the abandoned churchyard, he will warn of an enemy Mi-24 helicopter flying above, telling the player to go prone. However, the player can choose to shoot the helicopter down using a FIM-92 Stinger found in the church, causing MacMillan to begrudgingly praise them. In other instances, MacMillan will criticize the player character when he ruins their cover, and correct them when the player aims at the incorrect target.

=== Plot ===
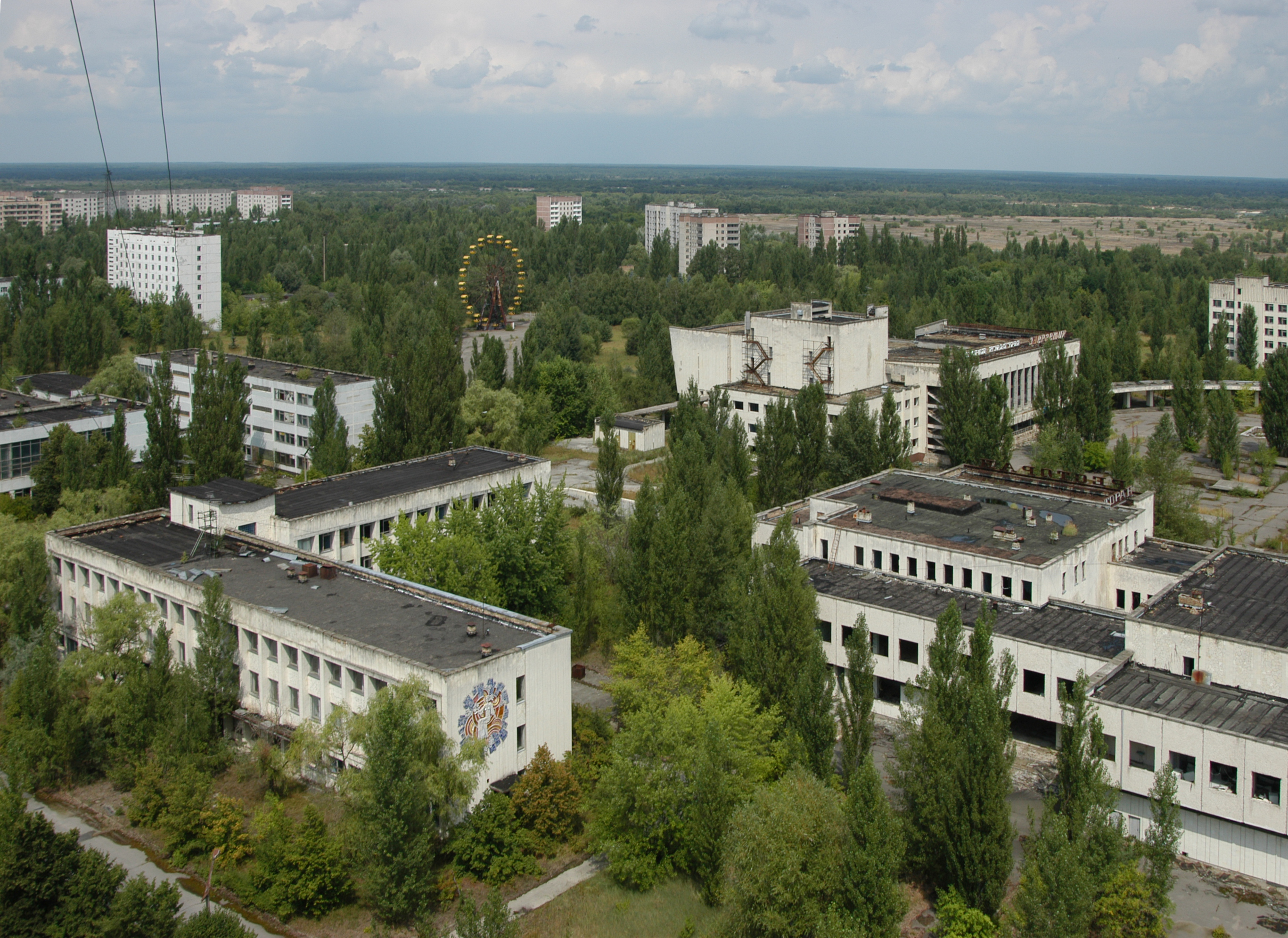
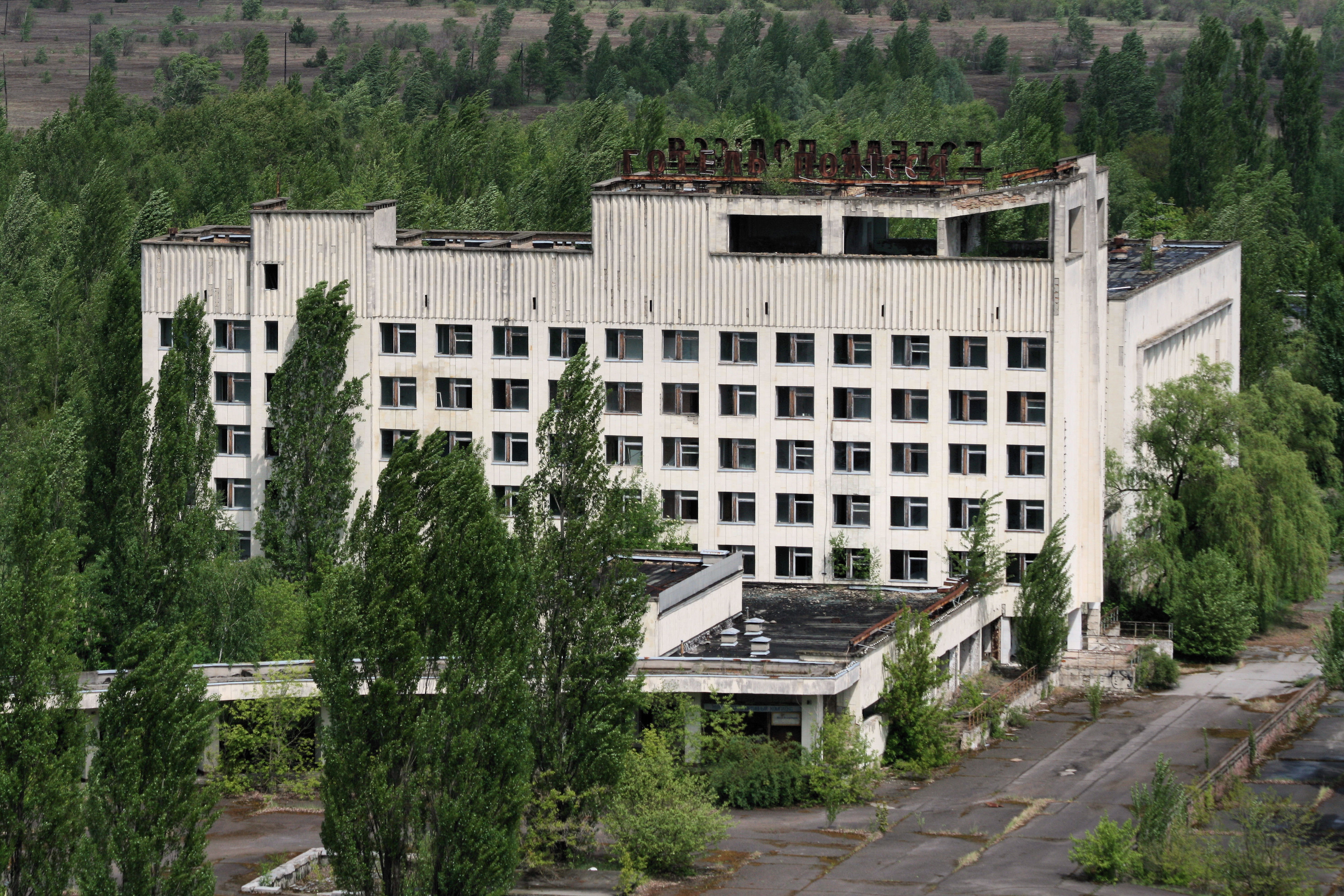
"All Ghillied Up" is set in Pripyat, Ukraine. Polissya hotel (right) is featured at the end of the level where Price and MacMillan set up for the assassination attempt.

"All Ghillied Up" is presented as a flashback in which the player assumes control of Captain John Price, as a lieutenant. It is set in 1996 in Pripyat, Ukraine, fifteen years before the events of the game. Pripyat is a town near Chernobyl which was abandoned after the 1986 Chernobyl nuclear disaster. In the level, Price and his superior Captain MacMillan have to sneak across the wasteland, avoiding Russian Ultranationalist soldiers. The mission ends with MacMillan and Price setting up in the abandoned Polissya hotel to prepare for an assassination of Imran Zakhaev, leader of the Ultranationalists, who has arranged a black market weapons deal with radioactive fuel rods from the Chernobyl plant. The next mission, "One Shot, One Kill", concludes with a failed assassination attempt, a hurried retreat, and a final stand-off in front of the Pripyat amusement park ferris wheel.

== Development ==
"All Ghillied Up" was designed by Mohammad Alavi, who also designed "Crew Expendable", another level in Modern Warfare, and "No Russian", a controversial level in the sequel Call of Duty: Modern Warfare 2. Alavi studied games from the Half-Life and Metal Gear Solid video games series when creating the level. In it, non-player characters react differently to the player based on distance and angle, rather than a simple proximity trigger. For example, a player might lie prone in the grass and an enemy will not notice them. This code was created in secret by Alavi due to the difficulty of explaining its intricacies to the artificial intelligence (AI) programmer, who was already swamped with work. Alavi called the internal code "garbage", but said that it still "did exactly what [he] wanted it to do", and that he did not "have to compromise on the feel of the gameplay". It took Alavi three months and more than 10,000 lines of code to make the first minute of gameplay for the level. The lead designer, Steve Fukuda, played the first minute ten different ways and had fun each time, which Alavi considered to be a success. The script was later used as the basis for the AI in Modern Warfare 2.

== Critical response ==
=== Initial reception ===
Many publications highlighted "All Ghillied Up" as a standout among other levels in the game. Official Xbox Magazine's Ryan McCaffrey praised "All Ghillied Up", opining that it was the best level in the game, and one of the best stealth levels in gaming. Jolt Online Gaming relished the level, describing it as tense, whilst Kristan Reed of Eurogamer described it as a bleak depiction of Chernobyl. Steve Hogarty of Computer and Video Games wrote that it was a stealth mission he had not seen anything like before, containing the best moments in the series and the high point of the game; he called it "thrilling" and a "moment of brilliance".

Numerous gaming outlets praised the section in which the player must crawl past enemy soldiers and tanks. Jeff Gerstmann writing for GameSpot recounted the section as a breathtaking moment, while McCaffrey commended the segment for its high tension. Writing for Destructoid, Earnest Cavalli described the section as "an experience that anyone with even a passing fetish for military ops absolutely must experience".

GameDaily's Steven Wong noted that players will experience different outcomes depending on their skill level. GameRevolution compared the level to those seen in the Metal Gear series.

=== Retrospective commentary ===
G. B. Burford of Kotaku called "All Ghillied Up" one of the best levels in video game history, citing its heavy freedom of choice in approaching the level. Comparing it to the game's previous level, "Safehouse", he remarked that, while the player could obey their commanding officer to get through the level successfully, they could also win by disobeying the officer's orders, and he would still back up the player, rather than simply killing the character for failing to obey. Burford also complimented the "incredibly tense" prone section as implementing the prone ability in an interesting way. PC Gamer said that "All Ghillied Up" was one of the strongest levels in Modern Warfare, and that it "demonstrates the real craft of a linear story-driven first-person shooter". They went on to compare it to DayZ, with its equally dramatic scenarios, and how it allowed for "personality and freeform set pieces".

IGN called the level one of the best stealth missions in games, while Digital Trends and NME described it as among the greatest in any first-person shooter. Ars Technica's Sam White compared the level's atmosphere and tension to that seen in the Fallout series. Sam Sant of Game Revolution said it was one of gaming's most iconic missions, also noting the ghillie suits worn in the mission are a fan favourite. PlayStation Official Magazine – UK called the level a "stealth masterclass", considering it to be the greatest level in a first-person shooter, and likely the best video game flashback of all time. The publication particularly praised the pacing and the degree of agency the level offers players. The Telegraph's Adam Starkey named the level as one of the series' ten most spectacular moments, describing it as "brilliantly tense", and calling it one of the greatest levels of the genre. Similarly, Sam Loveridge of Digital Spy classified "All Ghillied Up" as one of the best levels in the genre. Loveridge went on to acclaim the level's tension and described it as a "masterpiece of game design".

Humza Aamir of Techspot said the level was the most intense in the entire story and described it as infamous. GamesRadar+'s Leon Hurley wrote that the mission is "a masterpiece of tension and pacing", and that its recognizable setting and flow "make a level that's better than some entire games." Ben Tyrer of GamesRadar+ praised the level and compared it to "The Gulag", a level in Modern Warfare 2, writing they were both the "defining moments" in their respective stories as one similarity. He opined that "All Ghillied Up" is Modern Warfare's best level because it encourages players to avoid combat instead of embracing it. Tyrer went on to call it the "tense, thoughtful soul of the series" for its message of violence begets violence. Richard Moss of Gamasutra noted that, compared to other first-person shooter stealth missions, if the player gets spotted in "All Ghillied Up" the game will not have a fail screen, instead giving the player the chance to defend against many enemy soldiers. Moss went on to praise the tension and suspense and said it provides "a compelling argument that artful stealth design is more about the experience than the mechanics." Writing for Gamasutra, Mark Davies used "All Ghillied Up" as an example in examining pace in single-player games of which he described it as a "master class [sic] in forced pacing". Ars Technica said the level introduces parallels between Price and the game's main player character Soap MacTavish.

== Legacy ==
"All Ghillied Up" was referenced in the film Hardcore Henry, whose director, Ilya Naishuller called it one of the best levels of all time. In 2019's Call of Duty: Modern Warfare, a reboot of the sub series, players can unlock the "All Ghillied Up" pack which allows players to wear a ghillie suit and wield a bolt-action sniper rifle, in camouflage with additional netting and silencer similar to that seen in the mission. The single-player campaign of Call of Duty: Modern Warfare II (2022) features a mission called "Recon By Fire" in which the player stealthily clears an enemy camp as part of a sniper team wearing ghillie suits which has been strongly compared to "All Ghillied Up" for its numerous similarities. S.T.A.L.K.E.R. 2: Heart of Chornobyl (2024) features an Easter egg referencing the mission, players can find a sniper rifle and sniper nest at the Polissya Hotel.
