= Polissya hotel =

Ruined hotel in Pripyat, Ukraine

Coordinates: 51.40715°N 30.05823°E

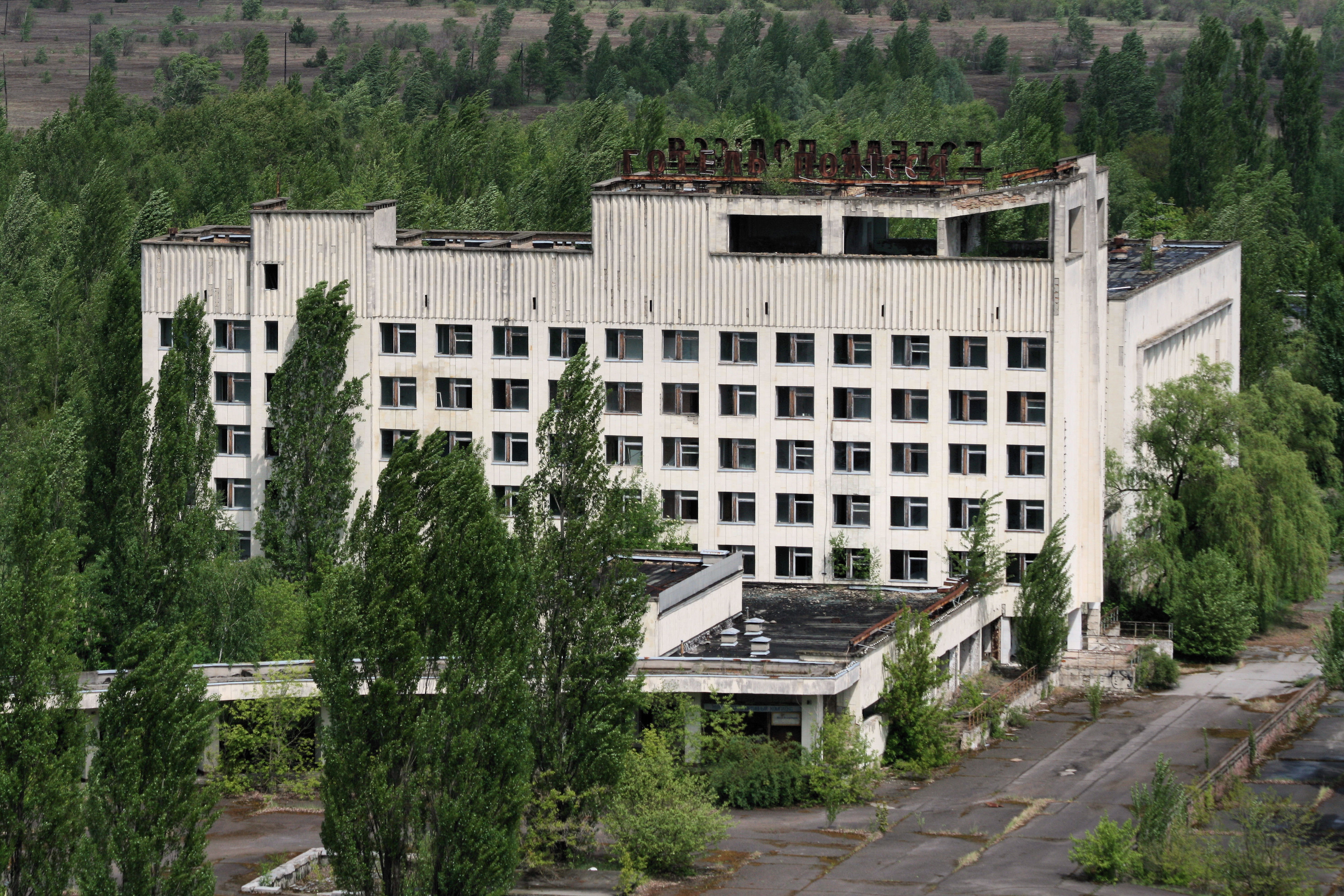
The Polissya hotel in May 2009

The Polissya hotel (Ukrainian: Готель Полісся, romanized: Hotel Polissia; Russian: Гостиница Полесье, romanized: Gostinitsa Polesye) is one of the tallest buildings in the abandoned city of Pripyat, Ukraine.

In operation for just over a decade, the Hotel Polissya was used as quarters for Soviet officials and engineers after the Chernobyl disaster in late April 1986. It was left to the elements after the Soviet government's initial response to the Chernobyl disaster concluded, and has now stood abandoned for 40 years.

== History ==
The Hotel Polissya was built in the mid-1970s to house delegations and guests visiting the Chernobyl Nuclear Power Plant. The hotel is situated on Pripyat's central square.

The hotel's last ordinary guests abruptly left as the Chernobyl plant meltdown on 26 April 1986 forced a mass evacuation, but the building continued to be occupied for weeks after the evacuation of Pripyat, housing nuclear engineers from across the USSR who came to observe the disaster and evaluate its consequences. The Soviet military helicopters that dumped sand, lead, and boric acid onto the burning reactor core were directed by spotters posted on the hotel's roof.

Images taken outside the hotel 30 years after its abandonment show heavily-overgrown vegetation reclaiming the property, though the hotel and its pavement remain recognisable. The interior is in poor condition, with little fittings or furniture remaining.

As of 2021, a section of the hotel's roof has become noticeably unstable, sparking concerns of a potential collapse.

== In popular culture ==
- The hotel is a primary setting for the 2019 miniseries Chernobyl.
- The hotel is featured in fourth-to-last level of the game S.T.A.L.K.E.R.: Shadow of Chernobyl, where it is the location of a crucial mission to obtain the game's best ending.
- The hotel is visible in the background of the Pripyat level of S.T.A.L.K.E.R.: Call of Pripyat, though it is outside the playable area.
- The hotel is featured in Call of Duty 4: Modern Warfare in the levels "All Ghillied Up" and "One Shot, One Kill", where Price and MacMillan shoot Zakhaev from.
- The hotel is seen in Suede's music video, "Life Is Golden".
- The hotel is featured in a few levels of the game Chernobylite. The building model (both inside and outside) is made using photogrammetry, and players are able to explore the building through the missions.
- The hotel is featured in Counter-Strike: Global Offensive on the map de_cache.
- The hotel appears in S.T.A.L.K.E.R. 2: Heart of Chornobyl, full of zombies and other enemies. On the top floor is also an Easter egg to Call of Duty 4's mission "All Ghillied Up".
