= Mohammad Alavi (game developer) =

Iranian video game developer

- Born: Tehran, Iran
- Other name: BadMofo
- Education: Virginia Tech; Full Sail University
- Occupation: Level designer
- Years active: 2004–present
- Employer(s): Infinity Ward (2004–2010); Respawn Entertainment (2010–2021); Wildlight Entertainment (2022–present)
- Known for: Call of Duty series

Mohammad Alavi (Persian: محمد علوی, Persian pronunciation: [mohæmˌmæd(e) (ʔ)ælæˈvi]) is an Iranian-American video game developer. He is best known for his work on the Call of Duty series at Infinity Ward, creating the "Crew Expendable" and "All Ghillied Up" missions from Call of Duty 4: Modern Warfare (2007) as well as the controversial "No Russian" mission from Modern Warfare 2 (2009).

== Biography ==
Mohammad Alavi was born in the 1980s in Tehran, Iran, and relocated to the United States with his family after the Iran–Iraq War. He remains proud of his family's culture, and calls himself "An Iranian inside his heart". Alavi attended Maggie L. Walker Governor's School for Government and International Studies in Richmond, Virginia. He then attended Virginia Tech, majoring in Biology and Chemistry before becoming a video game designer after being credited for creating some of the best modded games in PC Gamer magazine. He applied to and attended Full Sail University. He has two elder siblings, a brother and a sister, who are both physicians.

== Career ==
Alavi's main field of expertise is design and cinematic gameplay scripting. His creations have been described as "thoughtful" and noted in terms of artificial intelligence (AI) companion roles.

=== Entering the video game industry ===
During his college years, Alavi started to create mods for Duke Nukem 3D, Quake, Half-Life and Counter-Strike. His hobby was to work as a mapper and texture artist for mods. He later made a reputation for himself under the alias "BadMofo", when one of his works was published on an issue of PC Gamer. Alavi later entered Full Sail University to focus on programming, and applied for a programming job at Infinity Ward following his graduation. Considering his reputation as a modder, the company offered him a job as a level designer, instead of a programmer.

=== Call of Duty series ===
According to Edge, Alavi "is responsible for some of the most intense and memorable campaign levels in Call Of Duty history". PC Gamer called Alavi "the designer behind two of the most acclaimed missions in Call of Duty history ("All Ghillied Up" and "No Russian")".

Alavi created his first professional levels for Call of Duty 2, including the potato-throwing grenade tutorial.

The first level of Call of Duty 4: Modern Warfare, "Crew Expendable", which is set on a ship on a stormy sea is also his work. His design for the level was initially rejected by the leads, due to technical complexities, but Alavi stayed after hours and worked 18-hour days for three weeks to secretly script the rejected level. Once the leads viewed his unfinished work, they were convinced to include it in the game.

The same went for a flashback mission called "All Ghillied Up", when he ended up writing the necessary code himself. The "tense and deliberately paced mission" was debuted in E3 2007. The mission marked the first time in the series that non-player characters were capable of stealth behaviors. The mission won significant critical attention, being described as "One Of Gaming's Best Levels" and "The Best Call Of Duty Mission Ever" in reviews. In 2011, Now Gamer ranked the level the 20th on its "Top 50 Gaming Moments". It was also ranked #13 in IGN's "Top 100 Video Game Moments". Alavi's script for AI in Call of Duty 4: Modern Warfare, ended up having value and formed the template for the next title of the series, Call of Duty: Modern Warfare 2.

==== "No Russian" controversy ====
Alavi was the designer of Call of Duty: Modern Warfare 2's controversial mission called "No Russian". The mission was described "Call of Duty's most controversial moment" by PC Gamer and GamesRadar named it "one of the 10 most shocking game moments of the 2000s."

=== Titanfall series ===
In 2010, Alavi co-founded Titanfall's team in Respawn Entertainment alongside other former Call of Duty developers. He served as the senior map designer for the studio, and shot some motion capture footage as an actor. According to PC Gamer, its difficult to know the details of Alavi's design and scripting in the game, however his influence is apparent in "how Titanfall's on-map AI allies support the player". In an interview, Alavi stated that he was heavily involved in different aspects of the project, including AI design, gameplay and level design. He also bore much responsibility for the game involving a narrative component at all, pushing for longer and different introductions to each campaign map. In order to convince that the feature can be achieved within budget, he designed an introduction for "Airbase" map in three days.

Alavi resumed his work at Respawn Entertainment by working on Titanfall 2.

Alavi left Respawn Entertainment on January 10, 2022.

=== Wildlight Entertainment ===
Alavi joined Wildlight Entertainment in January 2022. He is listed on the studio's website as the "Lead Designer", although his LinkedIn profile describes the role as "Sr. Sandwich Analyst". At The Game Awards 2025, Wildlight Entertainment officially announced their new game Highguard.

== Games ==
- Call of Duty: United Offensive (2004)
- Call of Duty 2 (2005)
- Call of Duty 4: Modern Warfare (2007)
- Call of Duty: Modern Warfare 2 (2009)
- Titanfall (2014)
- Titanfall 2 (2016)
- Apex Legends (2019)
