= Call of Duty: Modern Warfare Remastered =

2016 first-person shooter video game

- Developer: Raven Software (Note: Additional work by Beenox, Certain Affinity and High Moon Studios. Original game developed by Infinity Ward.)
- Publisher: Activision
- Director: David Pellas
- Designer: Amos Hodge
- Series: Call of Duty
- Engine: IW (modified)
- Platforms: PlayStation 4; Windows; Xbox One
- Release: November 4, 2016 (Note: PlayStation 4 users who pre-purchased special editions of Infinite Warfare received Modern Warfare Remastered's campaign mode on October 5, 2016.)
- Genre: First-person shooter
- Modes: Single-player, multiplayer

Call of Duty: Modern Warfare Remastered is a 2016 first-person shooter game developed by Raven Software and published by Activision. It is a remastered version of the 2007 game Call of Duty 4: Modern Warfare, and was initially released as part of the special edition bundles of Call of Duty: Infinite Warfare in November 2016 for the PlayStation 4, Windows, and Xbox One. A standalone version was released for these platforms in mid-2017. The game's story follows the United States Marine Corps (USMC) and the Special Air Service (SAS), who take on missions to fight against a separatist group in the Middle East and an ultranationalist group in Russia.

Development began after an online petition requesting a Modern Warfare remaster began circulation. Activision enlisted Raven Software—who had assisted in the development of past Call of Duty games—to develop Modern Warfare Remastered, while original developer Infinity Ward supervised. Modern Warfare Remastered features extensive graphical enhancements, updated animations, and revised original sound effects as well as new ones. It retains the original core gameplay, with small adjustments. New multiplayer content, and additional single-player achievements and cheats are included.

Critics lauded Modern Warfare Remastered for its enhanced graphics, revised sound, and range of other modifications. They praised the gameplay for what was considered a challenging and innovative single-player campaign when compared to later games in the series. The multiplayer mode was complimented for its simplicity and freshness. Criticism focused on the multiplayer mode for balancing issues and the single-player mode for its pacing and artificial intelligence. Modern Warfare Remastered became the subject of controversy following Activision's decisions to initially release it only as part of a bundle, include microtransactions, and—in the eyes of players—overcharge for both the downloadable content (DLC) and standalone version of the game.

== Gameplay ==
Typical gameplay of a multiplayer match. In the clip, the player kills several enemy players on the opposing team, unlocking the ability to use killstreaks, while being awarded with medals.

Call of Duty: Modern Warfare Remastered features the same core gameplay as the original version: it is a first-person shooter in which the player controls several characters during the single-player campaign, alternating from one to another between missions. It includes some modifications consisting of adjusted timing to existing gameplay animations, while remaining nearly identical to their original counterparts. In the prone position, the player character's arms and equipped weapon are visible. In the multiplayer mode, players can perform a taunt, by allowing them to inspect the exterior of their gun for example, intended to humiliate a defeated opponent.

The single-player campaign is almost identical to the original. It retains the same collectibles and cheats while adding several more of the latter. The game offers full PlayStation Network trophy and Xbox Live achievement support—trophies were absent from Modern Warfare because the game was released before they were introduced—by including several new challenges.

Modern Warfare Remastered features an updated version of the multiplayer mode that shares similarities with those featured in later Call of Duty games. It includes the same weapons, killstreaks—rewards gained that allows the player to locate opponents or call in military aircraft to attack them—perks, and game modes as Modern Warfare. Existing modes present in other installments are included such as "Gun Game", in which the player receives a new weapon each time they kill an opponent, and "Hardpoint", involving players attempting to secure and defend a designated area from the opposing team. New modes like "Prop Hunt", where players hide as inanimate objects from the opposition, are also introduced. Medals is another incorporated feature present in previous games. These are awarded to players if specific circumstances are met when killing an opponent. The multiplayer mode offers a larger variety of customization options for profile personalization, guns, and characters. The game also added weapons. All new content can be unlocked through completing challenges, crafting, or buying in-game currency through microtransactions.

== Plot ==
Call of Duty: Modern Warfare Remastered features the same plot as the original game. The player mainly controls British Special Air Service (SAS) recruit Sergeant John "Soap" MacTavish, starting with his enrollment in the 22nd SAS Regiment. The player also controls United States Marine Corps (USMC) member Sergeant Paul Jackson during five of the levels of Act 1. SAS officer Captain John Price is playable in two flashback missions from 1996 when he was a lieutenant. The player further assumes the role of an American thermal-imaging TV operator aboard a Lockheed AC-130 gunship during one level, and a British operative infiltrating a hijacked airliner to save a VIP in another. Finally, the player controls Yasir Al-Fulani, the president of an unnamed Middle Eastern country before he is executed, although he has no freedom of action beyond turning his head.

While the United States invades a small, oil-rich Middle Eastern country following a coup d'état by the extremist Khaled Al-Asad, a British SAS squad infiltrates a cargo ship found to be carrying a nuclear device. Enemy jets sink the ship, but the SAS team escapes with its manifest and heads to Russia to rescue their informant, codenamed "Nikolai", from the Ultranationalist party. Intelligence from these operations indicates Al-Asad has a Russian nuclear device. The U.S. military launches an assault on his palace, but the nuclear device is detonated, wiping out most of the city and everyone in it.

The SAS team tracks down Al-Asad in Azerbaijan and discovers he was working with Imran Zakhaev, the leader of the Ultranationalist party. The mission then flashes back 15 years where Captain Price, who was a lieutenant, is sent alongside his commanding officer, Captain MacMillan, on a failed assassination attempt on Zakhaev in Pripyat, Ukraine. After killing Al-Asad, the SAS team, with support from U.S. Marine Force Recon and Russian loyalists, attempt to capture Zakhaev's son, Victor, and learn his whereabouts. They ambush Victor, but he commits suicide. In response, Zakhaev seizes control of a nuclear launch facility. A joint operation is launched to take back the site, but Zakhaev launches intercontinental ballistic missiles at the U.S. Eastern Seaboard. The joint teams are able to breach the facility and remotely destroy the missiles before fleeing the area.

Zakhaev's forces trap the escaping joint force on a bridge, and during the fight many are killed. He arrives, but a loyalist helicopter distracts him. The player shoots and kills Zakhaev with their pistol before being tended to by loyalist forces.

== Development ==
A comparison of Modern Warfare (top) and Modern Warfare Remastered (bottom). The latter features enhanced textures and lighting, new models, and changes to the heads-up display.

Activision became interested in a remaster of Call of Duty 4: Modern Warfare following the circulation of an online petition. The publisher approached Raven Software, which had assisted in the development of previous Call of Duty games, to be the primary developer; Infinity Ward would act as executive producer. Raven's studio director, David Pellas, recalled that every Raven employee agreed to undertaking a remaster. The developers pledged to focus throughout development on redefining the term remaster while respecting the original game. Much of Modern Warfare was "rebuilt [...] from the ground up" through the revitalization of its source code, materials, layouts, and effects that Infinity Ward allowed Raven to access. The game runs in a native 1080p resolution (increased to 4K for the PlayStation 4 Pro version) at 60 frames per second, and uses the then latest iteration of the series' IW engine.

Raven wanted the remaster to provide a faithful experience for fans of Modern Warfare. They looked to connect newcomers to a world that players were used to in recent Call of Duty games, albeit one that mirrored reality. To assist in their decision-making, Raven scoured social media websites to find active players of Modern Warfare to understand what they would want from a re-release of the game. Pellas noted that the risk of negative fan reactions resulting from changes to the original and the desire to meet expectations was daunting for Raven; they were encouraged by their leading principle of keeping the gameplay unchanged. Subtle adjustments were made to the timing of existing gameplay animations, such as the transition between aiming a sniper rifle and the scope overlay appearing, but these were designed to be as close to identical to the original as possible.

In bringing Modern Warfare's visuals up to modern standards, enhancements to the environments were designed using a procedure called "paint-over": color schemes were established and screenshots taken of the levels from Modern Warfare before they were overlaid with concept art. Raven wanted to give the environments a sense of history to avoid them feeling generic, with more visual details being integrated into them. The game used improved textures and mapping, effects, and lighting; objects were remodeled and new features such as realistic physics were used to move materials like clothing. The remaster became the first Call of Duty game to allow each gun to eject spent ammunition rounds accurate to that type, which was achieved through the inserted rounds remaining in the gun before ejection; identical rounds separate from those inserted were ejected in previous games. Raven faced some issues remastering the graphics, as the remaster used a heavily upgraded version of the series' engine. As a result, several of Modern Warfare's visual assets were not suited to the new technology, requiring the developers to enhance or remake them. The movement of non-player characters was improved to be more realistic. Several new first-person animations were added to the single-player campaign for immersion during certain scenes and to improve how the camera made use of the player character's body.

The remastering of the game's audio included reverberation, depth, and spatial effects; one example a Raven developer noted was that, "Layering out multiple sounds now makes a big difference." A range of other examples of sound not present in Modern Warfare were used. The original music and vocal performances were retained, although Al-Asad's Arabic dialogue was amended and re-recorded to represent the game's English subtitles more accurately. Other minor dialogue alterations included adjusting the order of several lines and including new ones in the game's training level. Following negative player feedback at the gaming convention Call of Duty: XP 2016, the developers reverted changes to the multiplayer mode's announcers. Similarly, the weapon audio was revised to more closely resemble that found in the original game.

As well as the remastering process, the game contained an array of new features. The multiplayer mode's content initially remained largely unchanged. Ten of the original sixteen maps were featured at launch, after the developers realized they could not remaster every map by the release date; the remaining six were released as a free update several weeks later. Raven supported the multiplayer mode from December 2016 to keep players invested in the game, introducing types of cosmetic customization and new melee weapons within a business model. This includes a loot box system, virtual crates branded in-game as "supply drops", which contain randomized items. Supply drops are obtained after purchasing in-game currency called Call of Duty Points (CP) or with Depot Credits earned through playing. Parts are another in-game currency used to craft items, acquired in supply drops or from duplicate items. Raven published playlists and seasonal events, which introduced new but similar customization content, multiplayer modes, and variants of existing maps. Further guns and melee weapons were incorporated during these events along with other game updates.

== Marketing and release ==
News of Call of Duty: Modern Warfare Remastered leaked on Reddit on April 27, 2016, before its official announcement. The leak included a screenshot of a reservation card for the retail chain Target with the Legacy Edition of Call of Duty: Infinite Warfare and the bundled remaster. A tweet in response on Call of Duty's official Twitter account the same day included two emoji in reply to a fan's 2014 tweet expressing excitement at the possibility of a Modern Warfare remaster, seemingly confirming its existence. On April 29, 2016, a leaked retailer advertisement for Infinite Warfare revealed that Modern Warfare Remastered would include the single-player campaign and ten multiplayer maps.

Modern Warfare Remastered was officially announced on May 2, 2016, during the reveal trailer for Infinite Warfare. The game was featured at 2016 Electronic Entertainment Expo, showing a trailer for its campaign. It revealed that PlayStation 4 users who pre-purchased (Note: Not to be confused with pre-ordering.) the special edition bundle of Infinite Warfare could play Modern Warfare Remastered's campaign 30 days before its release date as part of Sony's exclusivity deal with Activision. A gameplay video for Modern Warfare Remastered's "Crew Expendable" mission was released online on July 14, 2016. The game's multiplayer mode was revealed during the Call of Duty: XP 2016 convention, and attendees were able to play it first. In September 2016, trailers were released for both single and multiplayer modes.

Many criticized Activision's initial decision to make Modern Warfare Remastered available only for purchase through a special edition of Infinite Warfare. Critics recognized that Modern Warfare Remastered appealed highly to fans, and saw bundling the game as anti-consumerist, forcing players to pay more than necessary. Hardcore Gamer called the move "sickening", and Push Square felt it was "preposterous" and "a bullet in the face to consumers" due to Modern Warfare's influence in both the series and the first-person shooter genre. Several perceived the bundling as showing Activision's lack of faith in Infinite Warfare, and to ensure Call of Duty's continued growth. Others felt selling Modern Warfare Remastered separately would still be prosperous for the publisher; Rock, Paper, Shotgun's writer wrote they would spend more on the series if the modes of future installments, like the bundled games, were sold separately to allow them to purchase those they had the most interest in. Push Square believed a standalone would allow Activision to earn their fans' trust and money. They forecast an influx of pre-owned copies of the bundle, devaluing Infinite Warfare's worth and reducing the number of copies sold. Conversely, some described Activision's approach as "brilliant", seeing each game in the bundle as uniquely appealing to either former or longstanding fans of the series, and viewed the remaster as a valuable addition.

Modern Warfare Remastered was released worldwide on November 4, 2016, for the PlayStation 4, Windows, and Xbox One as part of the Legacy, Legacy Pro, and Digital Deluxe editions of Infinite Warfare. At the time, the game was available only by purchasing one of these editions of Infinite Warfare; with physical versions, Modern Warfare Remastered could only be played via Infinite Warfare's game disc. Activision confirmed Infinite Warfare must be permanently installed to use the included remaster.

=== Post-release ===
While adding new content several weeks after the release of Modern Warfare Remastered, Activision incorporated the use of microtransactions into the multiplayer mode, which had been absent from Modern Warfare. Data miners had previously uncovered hidden weapons within the game's files; fans regarded them as either an indication of future virtual goods or scrapped content. The choice to include microtransactions resulted in a backlash. PCGamesN called the decision "rubbing salt into the wound" after the criticism of bundling the remaster with Infinite Warfare. Concerns were raised that Modern Warfare Remastered would allow for gameplay advantages, similar to Activision's approach with recent Call of Duty installments. Others criticized what they perceived as Activision prioritizing revenue over improving the game, and helping to set an example for other video game publishers to sell re-releases with new or omitted content at extra cost.

On March 8, 2017, Activision announced that a remastered version of the Variety Map Pack downloadable content (DLC) originally released for Modern Warfare would be made available for Modern Warfare Remastered. It includes the same four maps and 10 rare supply drops. The map pack was released as a separate purchase for the PlayStation 4 on March 21, 2017, and for the Xbox One and Windows exactly a month later; it was not included with any retail versions of Modern Warfare Remastered. Activision was condemned for its decision that the DLC would not be free. Fans asserted that as a remaster, which often includes all previously released DLC from the original, the map pack should have been released with Modern Warfare Remastered when it launched. They also believed that selling the DLC for a higher price than its original release was unprincipled. The move was described by gaming journalist James Stephanie Sterling as highlighting "just how far [Activision] can mock its customers and get away with it", and by Hardcore Gamer as "one of the biggest rip-offs in recent memory." Hardcore Gamer believed the price increase because of inflation was erroneous; the 10 rare supply drops that were included held no value because they contained undesirable content; and few players were using the DLC maps. Some felt that including the DLC at no charge would have helped overcome wavering support from long-term fans, following the criticism of Infinite Warfare and the success of Electronic Arts' competing Battlefield 1. On the other hand, VG247 opined that the DLC was being sold because Modern Warfare Remastered was not sold at full-price as part of the Infinite Warfare bundle cost.

In June 2017, a standalone version of Modern Warfare Remastered was announced alongside its trailer; the game was released for the PlayStation 4 on June 27, 2017, followed by the Xbox One and Windows exactly a month later. The standalone received criticism for not including the DLC and for its price. Some critics thought the discounted Infinite Warfare bundle offered more value for money. Rock, Paper, Shotgun criticized the game's cost and the DLC for being sold separately, and considered the bundle was not worth its price. They noted Modern Warfare Remastered's playerbase had fallen significantly on Steam in prior months, and concluded, "What should've been exciting is mired in irritation." Destructoid's writer also condemned Activision's business practices around Modern Warfare Remastered, voicing their disinterest in buying the standalone after waiting more than half a year for its release. They concluded, "I might've parted with that much money for it last year, but not now. It's too late."

== Reception ==
=== Critical response ===
Reception

Aggregate scores
Aggregator	Score
Metacritic	(PS4) 83/100 (XONE) 89/100 (PC) 86/100
OpenCritic	87%

Review scores
Publication	Score
Destructoid	8/10
Hardcore Gamer	3.5/5
IGN	8.5/10
Push Square	9/10

Award
Publication	Award
IGN – Best of 2016 Awards	Best Remaster

Call of Duty: Modern Warfare Remastered received "generally favorable reviews", according to review aggregator Metacritic. OpenCritic determined that 87% of critics recommended the game. Push Square described it as "a ridiculously faithful remake" that "spruc[es] up an old care package for a more modern age to near-perfection." IGN used the accolade of "Best Remaster" in 2016 to praise it.

Critics lauded the enhanced graphics, revised sound, and other modifications. Push Square and GQ thought the remaster looked and sounded like a modern release, calling it "nothing short of a profound feat" and "an amazing technical overhaul". Several felt the game was more akin to a remake thanks to the range of enhancements. Destructoid complimented the "subtle" differences, highlighting level areas that felt more alive and the enhancements to the first-person cinematics. Although praising its scope, some considered the graphics were not quite cutting edge and occasionally exhibited minor shortcomings.

The modern-day setting and core gameplay of the single-player campaign were praised. Critics viewed the narrative as "forward-thinking" and sincere, and having pushed the boundaries of storytelling in the first-person shooter genre; others were reminded how the campaign had long endured with fans as a result. Destructoid felt the story had since been topped by its competition, but that it was still worth playing because of the mission variety and the relationship between Soap and Price. The gameplay was considered pleasantly challenging and urgent, with IGN's reviewer noting it made them feel "relatively weighed down, encumbered, and more desperate". The game's level design, set pieces, and emphasis on teamwork attracted further praise.

The multiplayer mode received similar praise. Push Square appreciated its faithfulness to the original. Destructoid complimented the map design and praised the gameplay for being welcoming to more casual players by requiring only moderate skill and agility. Critics considered the mode to be "refreshing" and just as enjoyable as faster-paced versions of more recent Call of Duty installments. Comparisons were made with Infinite Warfare; some thought that Modern Warfare Remastered's simpler design showed that "less can be more" and enjoyed that it allowed for different gameplay styles.

Certain aspects that were thought to have aged poorly or needed improvement received scrutiny. Critics attributed this to a desire to preserve Modern Warfare's authenticity for fans. The multiplayer mode was described as "outdated" and criticized for balancing issues involving overpowered perks and weapons and for its collision detection. IGN felt many of the multiplayer maps and campaign levels were uninspired and primarily designed for players to use cover; VG247 criticized the level design for directing players through a linear path that did not always appear to be the correct route. Hardcore Gamer disapproved of the decision to retain infinitely spawning enemies in the campaign and felt weapons found in the levels were "barebones" compared to those the player starts out with. Some felt the narrative suffered from pacing issues. Several critics noted lingering problems with the artificial intelligence, describing enemy behavior as "relying on numbers, rather than cunning" and that allies often hampered the player.

=== Windows version ===
Players criticized the Windows version of Modern Warfare Remastered for several reasons. On Steam, it received mostly negative user reviews; complaints cited poor performance, numerous hackers, and a low player count. Players felt Activision had failed to provide adequate support for the PC in favor of the game's console versions, a trait which had been apparent with previous installments in the series. PC Gamer noted that the game required a capable PC to run well. They criticized the multiplayer mode for not including custom servers and the lack of active players. As part of his close involvement in the game's development, David Pellas playtested the PC version; he stated before its release that it "play[ed] amazingly" and had a "fantastic" frame rate, while acknowledging that it had been played on a high-end gaming PC.

In mid-August 2024, Remastered ranked third on Steam's top-sellers chart several days before a fan-made mod for the game was set to release. The mod recreated the multiplayer mode of 2009's Call of Duty: Modern Warfare 2, as the 2020 remastered version of Modern Warfare 2 only includes its campaign mode. A day before its scheduled release, the mod was cancelled after Activision issued a cease and desist notice to its creators.
