= Call of Duty: Modern Warfare (2019 video game) =

2019 video game reboot

- Developer: Infinity Ward (Note: Additional work by High Moon Studios, Beenox, Raven Software, and Sledgehammer Games)
- Publisher: Activision
- Director: Jack O'Hara
- Producer: Paul Haile
- Designers: Jacob Minkoff; Brian Bright; Geoffrey Smith
- Programmer: Daniel Nelson
- Artists: Joel Emslie; Riccard Linde
- Writers: Ben Chaney; Brian Bloom; Justin Harris; Taylor Kurosaki
- Composer: Sarah Schachner
- Series: Call of Duty
- Engine: IW 8.0
- Platforms: PlayStation 4; Windows; Xbox One
- Release: October 25, 2019
- Genre: First-person shooter
- Modes: Single-player, multiplayer

Call of Duty: Modern Warfare is a 2019 first-person shooter game developed by Infinity Ward and published by Activision. Serving as the sixteenth overall installment in the Call of Duty series, as well as a reboot of the Modern Warfare sub-series, it was released on October 25, 2019, for PlayStation 4, Windows, and Xbox One.

The game takes place in a realistic and modern setting. The campaign follows a CIA officer and British SAS forces as they team up with rebels from the fictional Republic of Urzikstan, combating together against a Russian paramilitary group who have invaded the country and the Urzik terrorist group Al-Qatala, while searching for a stolen shipment of chlorine gas. The game's Special Ops mode features cooperative play missions that follow on from the campaign. The multiplayer mode supports cross-platform multiplayer and cross-platform progression for the first time in the series. It has been reworked for gameplay to be more tactical and introduces new features, such as a Realism mode that removes the HUD as well as a form of the Ground War mode that now supports 64 players. A post-launch update introduces a free-to-play battle royale mode, Warzone, which was also marketed as a standalone title. Multiplayer also supports shared-screen multiplayer. This mode includes bots, custom maps, custom game modes, and other creative game-interfering actions.

Infinity Ward began working on the game soon after the release of their 2016 title Call of Duty: Infinite Warfare. They introduced an entirely new engine for the game, which allows for new performance enhancements such as more detailed environments and ray-tracing capabilities. For the campaign, they took influence from real-life conflicts, such as the Syrian Civil War, the 2012 Benghazi attack, the raid on Osama bin Laden's compound, and terrorist incidents in London. For the multiplayer, they scrapped the franchise's traditional season pass and removed loot boxes, enabling them to distribute free post-launch content to the playerbase in the form of "Seasons".

Modern Warfare received praise for its gameplay, campaign, multiplayer, and graphics. Criticism focused on the handling of the campaign's subject matter, including the depiction of the Russian military, as well as balancing issues in the multiplayer. Retrospective reviewers rank it among the series' best titles, arguing it successfully revitalized the franchise with a more grounded tone and gameplay. The game had sold over 30 million units by September 2020. A sequel, titled Modern Warfare II, was released in 2022.

== Gameplay ==
=== Campaign ===
Players can use night-vision goggles during breaching and clearing.

Modern Warfare's single-player campaign focuses on realism and features tactically based moral choices whereupon the player is evaluated and assigned a score at the end of each level. On some occasions, players have to quickly ascertain whether NPCs are a threat or not, such as a civilian woman who is believed to be reaching for a gun, but then simply grabs her baby from a crib. This collateral damage score, referred to as a threat assessment, is based on how many civilians the player injures or kills and ranges from rank A to F. Rewards are introduced to those who score higher.

Character dialogue differs depending upon the choices the player makes in the game. Tactical decisions are included, such as the player using a sniper rifle in a large environment to approach objectives in a non-linear order, and choosing to shoot out lights in favor of using night-vision goggles during breaching and clearing.

=== Multiplayer ===
Modern Warfare's multiplayer has been revised from its predecessors to allow for a more tactical gameplay style, including a focus on map exploration, door breaching, and a Hardcore "Realism" mode that removes the HUD. The mini-map was originally removed in favor of a compass-style marker, with visual cues to detect friendlies and opponents. Following feedback from the multiplayer beta test, Infinity Ward re-implemented the mini-map but removed the appearance of red dots representing enemy players, except for when the UAV killstreak is used.

Multiplayer features the return of Killstreaks (rewards based on kills), with more recent Call of Duty titles having used Scorestreaks (rewards based on score) instead. Killstreaks can be converted into Scorestreaks with the use of an in-game perk called "Pointman". The online modes allow for a larger range of players within a map than previous installments, with a new mode called "Ground War" featuring over 100 players. Another new mode, "Gunfight", pits two teams of two players against each other, in small-scale matches lasting forty seconds per round.

The game includes an extensive weapons customization system, presenting most guns with a range of up to 60 total attachments to choose from, five of which can be equipped at any one time. The introduction at the start of multiplayer matches has also been revamped. While in previous titles players would remain motionless on the map as a timer would countdown to zero, players will instead be transported into the battle zone as part of various animations.

=== Special Ops ===
Modern Warfare is the first game in the series since 2013's Call of Duty: Ghosts not to feature a Zombies mode, instead featuring the cooperative "Special Ops" mode previously present in Call of Duty: Modern Warfare 2 and Call of Duty: Modern Warfare 3. Spec Ops shares its narrative with both the campaign and multiplayer. It includes a "Survival" mode, which was a timed exclusive to the PlayStation 4 release until October 2020. At launch, Special Ops features four Operations, which are multi-objective missions that take place in a large open map requiring mandatory 4-player cooperation; and Classic Special Ops, which features smaller scale missions, similar to the original Spec Ops mode.

=== Warzone ===
Modern Warfare includes a battle royale game mode called Warzone, introduced during Season 2. The mode features 150 players, battling either in teams of four, three, two, or solo. Warzone is released as a free standalone game which can be downloaded independently. The map combines several locations featured prominently in Multiplayer and Special Ops modes. Weapon balancing is maintained with parity to Multiplayer modes, with the exception of higher headshot damage to reward aiming. Similar to other battle royale games, Warzone features looting as a core aspect. Weapon customization is limited, as players can only pick up weapon variants with preset, unchangeable attachments.

Looting is simplified compared to other battle royale games in general, including Call of Duty: Black Ops 4's Blackout mode in particular: instead of browsing via inventory, all loot items are situated across the map for players to view and pick up. Players can use armor plates to increase damage protection, and can carry up to five armor plates to swap out and repair at any given point. Upon being defeated, instead of dying permanently, players are taken to the "Gulag", a prison area where defeated players can compete in 1v1 scenarios and gain a second chance to return to the main map. Players can loot and stock up cash, which are used at buy stations to buy load out drops, killstreaks, equipment and revive tokens for downed teammates.

== Synopsis ==
=== Characters and settings ===
Modern Warfare takes place in modern time, with the campaign occurring over the course of several days in late 2019. The Special Ops and multiplayer modes continue the story into 2020. The campaign story centers around a rising conflict between Russia and the fictional Republic of Urzikstan, also involving Western military forces. Players assume the roles of three protagonists: British SAS Sergeant Kyle "Gaz" Garrick (Elliot Knight), former Delta Force operator turned CIA SAC/SOG officer Alex Keller (Chad Michael Collins), and Urzikstan Liberation Force leader Farah Karim (Claudia Doumit). The three protagonists work together, alongside SAS Captain John Price (Barry Sloane) and CIA Station Chief Kate Laswell (Rya Kihlstedt).

Other allies include U.S. Marine Corps General Lyons (Debra Wilson), Colonel Norris (Nick Boraine), and Demon Dogs leader Sergeant Marcus Griggs (LaMonica Garrett/Demetrius Grosse); (Note: Garrett voices Griggs in the campaign, while Grosse voices the character in the multiplayer modes.) Farah's elder brother Hadir (Aidan Bristow); "Nikolai" (Stefan Kapičić), head of a Russian PMC acquainted with Price; and Yegor Novak (Alex Feldman), a Ukrainian fixer working for Nikolai. The allied forces are opposed by Al-Qatala, an Urzik terrorist organization led by Omar "The Wolf" Sulaman (Joel Swetow) and his right-hand man Jamal "The Butcher" Rahar (Nick E. Tarabay); as well as General Roman Barkov (Konstantin Lavysh), commander of the Russian forces occupying Urzikstan, and who treats the Urzikstan Liberation Force and Al-Qatala equally as terrorists.

The Special Ops and Multiplayer seasonal story takes place after the events of the campaign, with players taking on the roles of various international operatives working for a joint alliance named "the Armistice." The operators are divided into two major factions: Coalition (comprising Western forces) and Allegiance (comprising Eastern forces). The Armistice's leaders are Captain Price, Laswell, General Lyons, and FSB Sergeant Kamarov (Gene Farber). Throughout the story, the operators come into conflict with Al-Qatala, now led by Khaled Al-Asad following the demise of Sulaman during the campaign, working with Russian terrorist and arms dealer Victor Zakhaev (Dimitry Rozental).

The seasonal story introduces several new allies in both Coalition and Allegiance factions, including former CIA agent Mara (Carla Tassara), Spetsnaz operator Nikto (Gideon Emery), Task Force 141 recruits Simon "Ghost" Riley (Jeff Leach) and John "Soap" MacTavish (Neil Ellice), and Shadow Company mercenaries Marcus "Lerch" Ortega (Fred Tatasciore) and Rozlin "Roze" Helms (Jamie Gray Hyder).

Featured locations include the fictional countries of Kastovia and Urzikstan, as well as real locations such as the United Kingdom, Russia, Moldova, and Georgia.

=== Plot ===
In October 2019, during a covert operation in Verdansk, Kastovia to recover shipments of chemical weapons headed for Urzikstan, CIA SAC/SOG agent Alex is intercepted by unknown hostiles who kill the Marine Raiders accompanying him, and escape with the gas. Alex's handler, CIA Station Chief Kate Laswell, requests the assistance of British SAS Captain John Price in recovering the chemicals and de-escalating the situation with Russia. A day later, suicide bombers, affiliated with the Urzik terrorist organization Al-Qatala, attack Piccadilly Circus in London. SAS Sergeant Kyle "Gaz" Garrick, alongside a unit of Metropolitan Police CTSFO officers, is dispatched to contain the situation with Price's assistance. Afterwards, Alex is sent to Urzikstan to meet up with Urzikstan Liberation Force leader Farah Karim. She agrees to join forces in tracking down the gas, in exchange for his aid in overthrowing the occupying Russian forces led by General Roman Barkov.

SAS forces led by Price and Gaz raid an Al-Qatala-occupied townhouse in Camden Town, where they learn the location of their leader, Omar "The Wolf" Sulaman. Alex, accompanied by Sergeant Marcus Griggs and the Demon Dogs, move on Ramaza Hospital in Urzikstan and capture Sulaman. Later, Sulaman's lieutenant, Jamal "The Butcher" Rahar, launches an attack on the United States Embassy in Urzikstan in an attempt to free the terrorist. Price, Gaz, Alex, and Farah work together to secure Sulaman, but ultimately fail. Farah then plans to ambush Sulaman's men along the "Highway of Death" in Urzikstan, but fails when Barkov's soldiers arrive and attack both the ULF and Al-Qatala. Farah's brother and lieutenant, Hadir, is revealed to be responsible for stealing the chemical shipment in Verdansk. In an attempt to drive off the Russians, Hadir sets off the chemicals in the area, killing all of Barkov's men and Al-Qatala militants, with Farah and Alex barely surviving.

Hadir's motivations for using the gas are revealed—in 1999, Farah and Hadir were orphaned during Barkov's invasion of Urzikstan. The two attempted to escape the country, but were captured by Barkov and imprisoned for the next ten years. While in captivity, Farah assumed leadership of the ULF, and executed a breakout from Barkov's prison camp with Price's help. In the present day, Hadir has joined forces with Al-Qatala, forcing Farah and Price's team to act. They infiltrate Sulaman's hidden base and kill him, though fail to locate Hadir. With the gas still at large, the US government declares Farah's army a terrorist threat. Outraged, Alex defects from the CIA and joins the ULF.

Following intel on a possible attack in Russia orchestrated by Hadir, Price and Garrick travel to Saint Petersburg and meet up with Price's old contact, Nikolai. They intercept an Al-Qatala meeting and apprehend Rahar. When he refuses to comply with interrogation, Price kidnaps his family and threatens them, forcing Rahar to reveal that Hadir plans to attack Barkov at his estate in Baurci. Gaz is then given the choice to execute Rahar or leave him for the police.

At the estate, Price and Gaz rescue Barkov's family and capture Hadir, learning the location of Barkov's gas factory in Borjomi. Laswell arrives and informs Price that Russia demands Hadir be handed over to them. Price begrudgingly complies, on the condition that they retain the intelligence on the gas factory. Price and Gaz then meet up with Farah and Alex in Urzikstan and plan an attack on the factory, knowing that an extraterritorial attack will more than likely be viewed as being perpetrated by Al-Qatala rather than ULF forces.

With Laswell's assistance, the team advances on the factory, and attempts to use explosives provided by Nikolai to demolish it. The detonator is damaged in the fight, and Alex volunteers to detonate the explosives manually, seemingly sacrificing himself. As Barkov attempts to escape the facility by helicopter, Farah ambushes and kills him. Farah's forces and Price's team evacuate as the factory is destroyed.

With Barkov dead and disowned by the Russian government, Price meets with Laswell to discuss the creation of Task Force 141 to stop a Russian ultranationalist named Victor Zakhaev. Price reviews the files of potential recruits with Laswell: Gaz, John "Soap" MacTavish, and Simon "Ghost" Riley.

==== Special Ops ====
Following the death of Sulaman, Al-Qatala re-emerges with a new leader, named Khaled Al-Asad, who poses a dangerous threat to Kastovian forces in Verdansk. Laswell, alongside Sergeant Kamarov of the FSB, authorizes a joint operation, enlisting many of the world's best operators in fighting against the new threat. The joint faction, known as Armistice, takes on various Al-Qatala operations in Verdansk, eliminating several key figures within the organization: Almalik, the Landlord; "El Traficanté", the Smuggler; and Al-Qatala's head of financial operations, the Banker. Following a hostage rescue operation, the Armistice learns that Al-Qatala has been dealing in arms trade with Zakhaev, who is revealed to have been the benefactor behind Al-Qatala's recent resurgence.

==== Multiplayer/Warzone ====
Following the initial operations in Verdansk, both the Coalition and Allegiance continue to dispatch their respective agents on missions to various hot zones where Al-Qatala forces have been sighted. The alliance between Allegiance and Coalition factions continue to fracture, when operators from both sides come into conflict, while intercepting an Al-Qatala chemical shipment in Urzikstan. Some time later, Al-Qatala unleashes chemical attacks across Verdansk, causing the two factions to fight against each other, as well as among themselves for survival, as toxic gas surrounds the city. Amidst the chaos of Armistice's fall, Task Force 141 member Ghost requests Price to send in reliable reinforcements. Having survived the ordeal at Barkov's factory, Alex re-emerges, now with a prosthetic leg, and is sent to Verdansk to assist Ghost.

After intercepting a phone call between Al-Asad and Zakhaev, the Armistice leaders learn that Al-Qatala has been shipping armaments to various bunkers located throughout Verdansk, from experimental weapon prototypes to nuclear warheads. Price and Gaz are deployed to Verdansk to assist the ongoing war effort. Frustrated with the lack of results from the Armistice, a private military company called Shadow Company sends forces to Verdansk to hunt down Zakhaev. A Shadow squad led by Marcus "Lerch" Ortega infiltrates the city's stadium, where they believe Zakhaev is located after Allegiance forces intercepted radio chatter coming from the stadium.

After learning that Zakhaev has been using Verdansk's subway tunnels to move around undetected, Price sends Farah and Nikolai to infiltrate and reclaim the tunnels, restoring power to the metro system. Eventually, Task Force 141 hacks into Zakhaev’s comms, locating him at a nuclear silo in Bunker 10. At the bunker, Zakhaev has armed the nuke and is preparing to launch. He is shot by Price and then thrown down the silo, seemingly killing him. Price manages to terminate the missile launch just in time with Nikolai's help. As the battle in Verdansk continues to rage on, Price is contacted by Soap, requesting backup "half a kilometer off the coast".

== Development ==
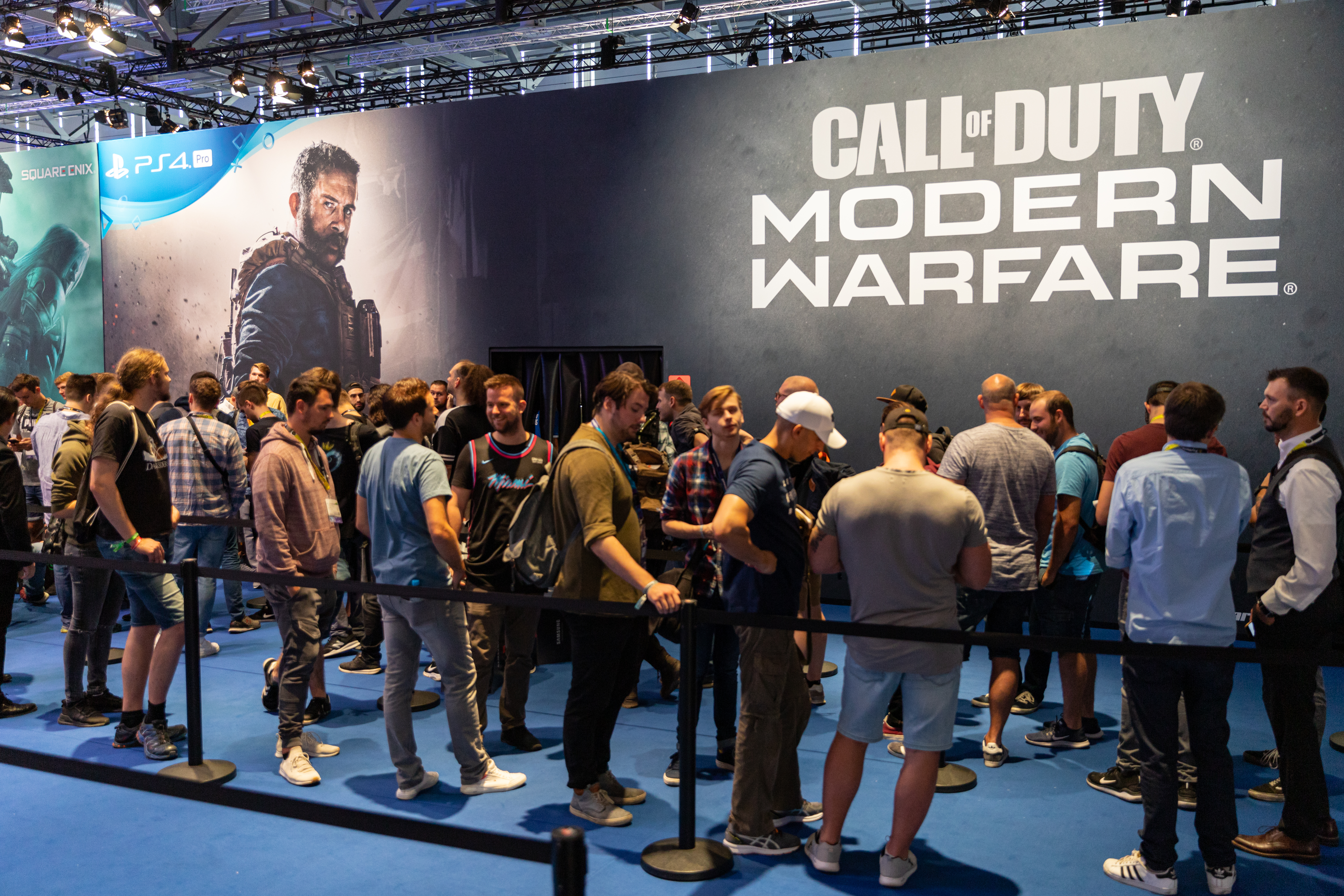
Promotional booth at Gamescom 2019

The game was developed by Infinity Ward, following their 2016 entry Infinite Warfare, and continuing in the "three year development cycle" tradition for the franchise. High Moon Studios, Beenox, Raven Software, and Sledgehammer Games all provided additional development. The game uses a brand-new engine for the series, allowing for the use of more detailed environments, advanced photogrammetry and rendering, better volumetric lighting, and the use of ray tracing. The new engine had been in development five years prior to the release of the game, and was a collaborative effort between the main Infinity Ward studio in California and the new studio in Poland. On May 30, the game's official trailer and release date were unveiled. According to narrative director Taylor Kurosaki, Captain Price will be featured in a retconned narrative "where the events in the previous Modern Warfare timeline have not occurred."

Studio art director Joel Emslie described the game's narrative as "much more grown-up [and] mature", designed to elicit a more intimate and emotional response from players through a depiction of conflict based on contemporary events, such as terror attacks in London and the Syrian Civil War, rather than the original trilogy's reliance on bombastic set pieces. Campaign gameplay director Jacob Minkoff expressed his desire for video games to go further in exploring otherwise traditionally taboo topics in the medium, noting that television series and films such as Homeland, American Sniper, and Sicario told "relatable, realistic, relevant, and provocative stories that really touch people."

In avoiding telling such stories insensitively, consultants were brought in from multiple cultures. For example, conflict related to the Middle East in the game is located in the fictional country Urzikstan rather than based on any specific real-life location. (Note: The game depicts several locations, including Urzikstan, a fictional country that draws similarities to Afghanistan, Chechnya, Syria and Ukraine. Furthermore, Georgia and Moldova have also featured in the game.) Half of the game has been described as having morally complex choices, and the narrative has resulted in making several playtesters cry.

The story is inspired by real events and conflicts, such as the Soviet invasion of Afghanistan, the Iraq War, the Arab Spring, and the Syrian Civil War. Some controversial aspects of the game were removed prior to its release, as the developers were unsure of how much potential emotional discomfort they wanted to effect. This included a line in which a Russian soldier ponders handing over a captured girl to his commanding officer, implying pedophilia. Retired U.S. Navy SEALs Mitch Hall and Steve Sanders served as consultants for the game. Infinity Ward's Audio Team went to a desert with 90 microphones to capture the audio of each weapon for the game.

=== Post-launch content ===
For the first time in the franchise history, Modern Warfare does not include the previous downloadable content model of paid map packs and season passes. Instead, all post-launch maps and modes are added for free, while Activision focuses on the distribution of microtransactions. The in-game Store sells a variety of bundles, containing cosmetic items such as Operator characters, outfits, weapon blueprints, and more. All items and bundles are bought using the COD Points currency, featured in previous Call of Duty titles.

Similar to Black Ops 4's Operations, the game's content packs are released in "Seasons", each lasting roughly eight weeks. The game features the battle pass model, which grants 100 tiers of cosmetic items that unlock just by playing the game. New weapons are introduced via the battle pass, as well as through in-game challenges and store bundles.

In preparation for Halloween and part of Season 6, new content dropped featuring the "Haunting of Verdansk". New game modes and operator bundles were released based on the theatrical films Saw and The Texas Chainsaw Massacre. The event included an in game opportunity to earn personalization rewards through a "Trick or Treat" loot system. The event lasted from October 20 to November 3.

== Release ==
The game was released on October 25, 2019, for Xbox One, PlayStation 4 and Windows. Modern Warfare was later released on Steam on March 8, 2023. The game was made available in Xbox Game Pass on April 17, 2026, across Game Pass Ultimate, Game Pass Premium, PC Game Pass tiers.

== Reception ==
=== Pre-release ===
Following previews at E3 2019, the game was subject to some controversy in response to it tackling realistic and mature subject matter, such as presenting child soldiers and the ability to shoot civilians, including infants. former Escapist Magazine affiliate Ben "Yahtzee" Croshaw described the gameplay demonstration as "fifteen minutes of cold intense ruthless killing" and IGN felt it was the most divisive game of the event.

Other critics also gave mixed opinions. Recalling the past successes of video games as a medium to provide social commentary on war and conflict, such as Spec Ops: The Line, This War of Mine, and Call of Duty 4: Modern Warfare, Emma Kent of Eurogamer criticized a level in which the player apparently controls a child soldier, which she felt inappropriately merged sensitive subject matter and over-dramatized violence into a boss fight, creating "a Frankensteinian, dissonant mess." Kent described another level involving a stealth operation inside a building as having a "heavy-handed" emphasis on avoiding civilian collateral damage, although praised it as "a good exploration of the way terrorists are embedded within civilian communities."

Cade Onder of GameZone similarly commented on the civilian collateral damage and child soldier level, opining that the former lacked tension because there was only one civilian present, thereby only granting the illusion of choice, and the latter turning "an otherwise very real and grounded moment [...] into a very video game-y moment." Also comparing it to Spec Ops: The Line, Onder reflected on whether killing too many civilians would merely result in a game over, causing ludonarrative dissonance, and how the linearity of the game may prevent it from reaching its narrative ambitions.

The game's multiplayer beta in September 2019 was withdrawn for unknown reasons from the PlayStation Store in Russia. A prominent theory posits that this is because the Russian media had been critical of the game's campaign's reportedly favorable portrayal of the White Helmets, a volunteer organisation that operates in parts of opposition-controlled and Turkish-occupied Syria. In October 2019, Sony announced that Modern Warfare would not be sold on the PlayStation Store in Russia.

=== Post-release ===
Reception

Aggregate score
Aggregator	Score
Metacritic	PC: 81/100; XONE: 80/100; PS4: 80/100

Review scores
Publication	Score
Game Informer	8.75/10
GameSpot	7/10
GamesRadar+	4/5
Giant Bomb	4/5
Hardcore Gamer	4.5/5
IGN	8/10
PCMag	4.5/5
USgamer	3/5

Call of Duty: Modern Warfare received "generally favorable reviews" on all platforms according to review aggregator site Metacritic. The game was praised for its gameplay, campaign (being considered by critics as one of the best in the franchise), multiplayer, graphics, and overall improvements to the Call of Duty formula. However, the campaign received some criticism for aspects in the handling of its subject matter, as well as minor balancing issues with some of the online modes.

=== Retrospective reviews ===
Retrospective assessments of Call of Duty: Modern Warfare rank it consistently in the top five or top ten games in the franchise. It received praise for successfully revitalizing the franchise. The game's campaign has received praise as one of the series' best that harkened to older titles, citing memorable missions, tone, and set pieces. Its multiplayer mode was well received for its new mechanics, new modes, such as Ground War, Gunfight, and Realism, and revamped gunplay, with Chris Freiberg of Den of Geek writing, "Each weapon feels like it has some real weight, giving each shot some impact." The game also laid the foundation for Warzone, which became a major part of the franchise.

However, the multiplayer received some criticism for heavily changing traditional Call of Duty features, such as removing the Prestige system, encouraging camping-friendly gameplay, and having weaker map design. Complex's Dan Wenerowicz argued that the game's emphasis on grounded gameplay ultimately hurt later Call of Duty titles, leading to worse games in the ensuing years.

=== Sales ===
Modern Warfare earned over $600 million within its first three days of release, making it the highest-selling game in the franchise during the current console generation and breaking several sales records, including the best digital opening in Activision's history, the most digital units sold for a game in three days on PlayStation 4, and the best Call of Duty launch on PC. In Japan, it was released in the top 20 video games chart with 117,670 units sold in the first week. On December 18, 2019, Activision confirmed Call of Duty: Modern Warfare had earned over $1 billion in revenue, and by September 2020 the game had sold over 30 million units. As of 2025, the game has sold over 41 million units and is considered as one of the best-selling video games of all time.

=== Awards ===
Year	Award	Category	Result	Ref.
2019	Game Critics Awards	Best Action Game	Nominated	
2019	Game Critics Awards	Best Online Multiplayer	Won	
2019	2019 Golden Joystick Awards	Ultimate Game of the Year	Nominated	
2019	Hollywood Music in Media Awards	Original Score - Video Game	Won	
2019	Titanium Awards	Best Action Game	Nominated	
2019	The Game Awards 2019	Best Audio Design	Won	
2019	The Game Awards 2019	Best Action Game	Nominated	
2019	The Game Awards 2019	Best Multiplayer Game	Nominated	
2020	18th Visual Effects Society Awards	Outstanding Visual Effects in a Real-Time Project	Nominated	
2020	Guild of Music Supervisors Awards	Best Music Supervision in a Video Game	Nominated	
2020	23rd Annual D.I.C.E. Awards	Action Game of the Year	Nominated	
2020	23rd Annual D.I.C.E. Awards	Online Game of the Year	Nominated	
2020	23rd Annual D.I.C.E. Awards	Outstanding Achievement in Animation	Nominated	
2020	23rd Annual D.I.C.E. Awards	Outstanding Achievement in Art Direction	Nominated	
2020	23rd Annual D.I.C.E. Awards	Outstanding Achievement in Audio Design	Nominated	
2020	23rd Annual D.I.C.E. Awards	Outstanding Technical Achievement	Nominated	
2020	NAVGTR Awards	Art Direction, Contemporary	Nominated	
2020	NAVGTR Awards	Game, Franchise Action	Nominated	
2020	NAVGTR Awards	Graphics, Technical	Nominated	
2020	NAVGTR Awards	Lighting/Texturing	Nominated	
2020	NAVGTR Awards	Original Dramatic Score, Franchise	Nominated	
2020	NAVGTR Awards	Use of Sound, Franchise	Won	
2020	Game Developers Choice Awards	Best Technology	Nominated	
2020	Game Developers Choice Awards	Best Audio	Nominated	
2020	SXSW Gaming Awards	Excellence in Gameplay	Nominated	
2020	SXSW Gaming Awards	Excellence in Multiplayer	Nominated	
2020	SXSW Gaming Awards	Excellence in SFX	Nominated	
2020	16th British Academy Games Awards	Animation	Nominated	
2020	16th British Academy Games Awards	Audio Achievement	Nominated	
2020	16th British Academy Games Awards	Multiplayer	Nominated	
2020	16th British Academy Games Awards	Performer in a Leading Role (Barry Sloane)	Nominated	
2020	16th British Academy Games Awards	Technical Achievement	Nominated	
2020	Famitsu Dengeki Game Awards 2019	Best Shooter	Nominated	
2020	18th Annual G.A.N.G. Awards	Audio of the Year	Nominated	
2020	18th Annual G.A.N.G. Awards	Sound Design of the Year	Nominated	
2020	18th Annual G.A.N.G. Awards	Best Dialogue	Nominated	
2020	18th Annual G.A.N.G. Awards	Best Game Audio Publication, Presentation, or Broadcast (Call of Duty: Modern Warfare - Infinity Ward)	Nominated	
2020	18th Annual G.A.N.G. Awards	Best Audio Mix	Won	
2020	2020 Webby Awards	Best Art Direction	Nominated	
2020	2020 Webby Awards	Best Game Design	Nominated	
2020	2020 Webby Awards	Multiplayer/Competitive Game	Nominated	
2020	2020 Webby Awards	Technical Achievement	Nominated	
2020	2020 Golden Joystick Awards	Esports Game of the Year	Won	
2020	The Game Awards 2020	Best Esports Game	Nominated	

== Controversies ==
=== Use of white phosphorus ===
Modern Warfare has been criticized for its inclusion of white phosphorus strikes as a killstreak in the multiplayer. Use of white phosphorus as an incendiary agent is regulated by international law: the provisions of the Convention on Certain Conventional Weapons, specifically the Protocol on Incendiary Weapons, prohibit the use of incendiary weapons against or near civilian areas.

In a statement to IGN, former U.S. Marine John Phipps criticized the game for failing to realistically portray the effects of the substance, saying "I find Modern Warfare's use as a killstreak reward a nearsighted glorification of what myself and others consider to be a violation of the laws of armed conflict. Contrary to their overall goals towards realism in its campaign, the multiplayer mode in CoD doesn't depict the effect White Phosphorus (WP) has on the human body in any kind of realistic way. I don't object to things like WP being examined in games, so long as we depict them as they truly are". In her review of the game, Kallie Plagge of GameSpot made note of the inclusion of white phosphorus as a killstreak reward in multiplayer and included it in her list of the game's negative aspects, adding that it "goes against everything the campaign stands for".

=== Depiction of Russians ===
The game's user score on Metacritic became the subject of review bombing by those who were angered by the campaign's depiction of the Russian military and accused developers Infinity Ward of being Russophobic. The user score for the PlayStation 4 version dropped to 3.0/10, while the user score for the Windows version dropped to 2.4/10. Sony Interactive Entertainment decided not to sell the game on the PlayStation Store in Russia.

Criticism by players focused on a certain level in the campaign, in which it is revealed that Russian forces previously carried out an attack on an area dubbed the "highway of death", killing many civilians who had been departing a town that was under siege. The real-life Highway of Death is a highway located between Kuwait and Iraq on which 1000 soldiers and civilians were killed in an attack led by American forces during the Gulf War in 1991. Consequently, some users felt that Infinity Ward were attempting to rewrite historical events by shifting blame for the attack to Russia. Infinity Ward had previously stated that Modern Warfare's campaign was a work of fiction. In addition, they highlighted how in the game's cooperative Special Ops mode, which acts as a sequel to the campaign's story, the playable character and their group eventually ally with Russian forces for one of the missions. However, narrative director Taylor Kurosaki had previously said that the story was inspired by real events and conflicts, including the Soviet–Afghan War and conflicts in the Middle East.

Additional complaints targeted a flashback level in the campaign which saw Farah Karim, one of the protagonists, inspired by female Kurdish fighters who battled Islamic State in northern Syria, have her home invaded by a Russian soldier when she was a child, with her subsequently disarming and killing the soldier. The level's display at E3 2019 drew particular criticism from Polygon's Charlie Hall, who retrospectively labelled the Russian killed as a "grotesque caricature". Infinity Ward studio art director Joel Emslie took blame for the character's appearance, stating that "what I was going for artistically was [...] we're always trying to work for a cinematic experience. I'm trying to create something really memorable. And I kept thinking, metaphorically, these children are being chased by a monster in a maze, and I kept thinking a Minotaur. It's ridiculous—but he's almost robotic".

== Sequels ==
Three further games in the Modern Warfare sub-series reboot have been released: Modern Warfare II in 2022, Modern Warfare III in 2023 and Modern Warfare 4 in 2026.

== Notes and references ==
Notes
