= No Russian =

Mission from Call of Duty: Modern Warfare 2

- A screenshot of "No Russian" in 2009
- First appearance: Call of Duty: Modern Warfare 2 (2009)
- Last appearance: Call of Duty: Modern Warfare 2 Campaign Remastered (2020)
- Created by: Mohammad Alavi
- Genre: First-person shooter

In-universe information
- Location: Zakhaev International Airport, Moscow
- Characters: PFC Joseph Allen (Note: Working undercover for the CIA as Alexei Borodin); Vladimir Makarov; Viktor; Lev; Kiril

"No Russian" is the fourth mission of the 2009 video game Call of Duty: Modern Warfare 2 and its 2020 remaster. In the mission, the player controls Army Ranger PFC Joseph Allen, who–whilst undercover for the CIA with the alias "Alexei Borodin" in an attempt to gain the trust of Russian ultranationalist terrorist Vladimir Makarov–participates in a mass shooting by Makarov's group at an airport in Moscow. The player may elect not to personally shoot any civilians and the mission may be skipped without penalty by selecting so before the mission commences and may skip the mission at any point during the mission.

Iranian-American game designer Mohammad Alavi was heavily involved in the mission's development. Alavi wanted the mission to serve as a catalyst for the game's plot, and create an emotional connection between the player and Makarov. Much of the mission's development was spent designing the massacre portion, which Alavi did not want to feel too contrived or traumatic. Members of the game's development team were polarized in their opinions of the mission; several game testers expressed disapproval, including one who refused to play it at all.

"No Russian" is noticeably more graphic than any other mission in the game. It sparked significant controversy for allowing players to directly participate in a terrorist mass killing, and became a heavily discussed subject in both gaming publications and major news publications. Due to the mission’s graphic content, the game was subject to censorship in some countries, including the entire removal of the mission from Russian versions. Journalists at the time described its plot as illogical and claimed that the ability to skip it rendered it pointless, but have since discussed its importance to the video game industry.

== Content ==
Before the single-player mode begins, a warning message notifies the player of the option to skip the level should they find its content "disturbing or offensive"; if the player chooses to bypass the level, they miss no achievements and their progress in the game is not penalized whatsoever. In the mission, the player controls Joseph Allen, an undercover CIA operative tasked with infiltrating and gaining the trust of a Russian ultranationalist terrorist organization led by Vladimir Makarov. To accomplish this goal, he must participate in a mass shooting at Zakhaev International Airport in Moscow.

"No Russian" begins with the player in an elevator with Makarov and three other gunmen. Makarov tells the group "Remember, no Russian" – an instruction to only speak English; the group likewise also uses American & NATO weaponry. After exiting the elevator, Makarov and the other gunmen proceed to shoot at a large group of civilians and lightly armed security at an airport security checkpoint. The player then accompanies the gunmen as they walk through the airport killing any remaining civilians. Once the player exits the airport, they enter a firefight with FSB agents, some of whom have riot shields. At the end of the massacre, Makarov reveals that he knew of Allen's true identity before killing him; his goal was for Russian officials to discover that one of the assailants was an American, in order to frame the attack as being committed by Americans (hence "No Russian"), and for Russia to declare war on the United States.

"No Russian" is noticeably more graphic than any other level in the game – civilians' screams can be heard throughout and the crawling injured leave blood-trails. The player is not forced to shoot any civilians, however, and may instead walk through the airport as the massacre unfolds. The game does not explicitly require the player to shoot civilians, and the gunmen have no reaction towards the player if the player does not shoot innocents. However, should the player attack the gunmen, they will retaliate, causing the player to fail the mission. The FSB agents must be killed in order to complete the level.

== Development and history ==
"No Russian" was envisioned early in the development of Call of Duty: Modern Warfare 2. Members of the development company Infinity Ward initially wanted to make a level where the player would pilot a Lockheed AC-130 and kill zombies in Moscow. When the fantasy elements were scrapped, the development team shifted their focus to a level centered around a terrorist attack at a Moscow airport, which was influenced by air travel safety concerns following the September 11 attacks. Lead writer Jesse Stern believes people have an innate desire to experience mass shootings firsthand, and says that this belief inspired the idea of having the player control a terrorist. Stern cited documentaries about the 2008 Mumbai attacks and the Columbine High School massacre as evidence, and said: "These are human beings who perpetrate these acts, so you don't really want to turn a blind eye to it. You want to take it apart and figure out how that happened and what, if anything, can be done to prevent it. Ultimately, our intention was to put you as close as possible to atrocity."

Game designer Mohammad Alavi was heavily involved in the level's development, from programming the artificial intelligence to directing the motion capture used for the character animations. Alavi's intentions while working on "No Russian" differed from Stern's, as he simply wanted the level to serve as a catalyst for the game's narrative. In a 2012 interview, Alavi said he had three goals while working on "No Russian": "Sell why Russia would attack the U.S., make the player have an emotional connection to the bad guy Makarov, and do that in a memorable and engaging way." Alavi drew inspiration from news articles and films, and did not interview victims of real terrorist attacks.

Much of the level's development constituted designing the massacre. In the first iteration of "No Russian", the massacre ended once the group of civilians were killed outside the elevator, which then transitioned into a firefight. Alavi felt that having an emotional scene abruptly shift into a firefight was "gimmicky". He altered the level to prolong the massacre. He also removed scenes with children or families hugging each other to reduce player trauma. "No Russian" initially featured a limited amount of gore, a decision that was changed when the wife of lead artist Joel Emslie questioned the authenticity of such a level without blood. Due to the level's emotionally charged set piece, some of the voice actors became tearful while reciting their lines.

Some members of Infinity Ward strongly opposed the level's content, while some members suggested the player should control a security guard instead of a terrorist. According to Emslie, "No Russian polarized this studio". Alavi was not aware of any pushback from Activision, the game's publisher, about the level, but did note that game testers elicited a variety of reactions. Many were initially angry and confused at the level's content, but eventually settled down and began shooting at the civilians. One tester refused to play the level at all but was willing to play the rest of the game. This led to the implementation of the skip feature, as Alavi did not want the player to be punished for not doing what they felt was morally wrong.

== Initial reception ==
Prior to the release of Call of Duty: Modern Warfare 2, video footage from "No Russian" was illegally leaked onto the Internet. Activision quickly confirmed the level's existence and clarified its context within the game. In an email statement, Activision wrote how the level was "not representative of the overall gameplay experience in Modern Warfare 2". The video was a popular story in both gaming publications and major news publications, including the Associated Press and The Guardian. Journalists attributed the story's widespread exposure to the series' cultural significance.

The leaked footage divided video game journalists. The Daily Telegraph's Tom Hoggins felt that while he could not properly judge the level without having played it, he still questioned whether Infinity Ward had approached the level from the wrong direction by letting the player use grenades to "treat these civilians as human bowling pins". Writing for The Guardian, Keith Stuart criticized the skip feature, describing it as a "cop-out" for a level that the developer intended players to experience. James Stephanie Sterling of Destructoid was more positive, as they thought that it was a statement that video games could discuss controversial topics, which they felt that many developers would often shy away from. They felt if "No Russian" was able to make players question whether the deaths of innocent civilians were justifiable, then video games could finally be considered an art form.

While Call of Duty: Modern Warfare 2 received critical acclaim at its release, journalists heavily criticized the content of "No Russian". Marc Cieslak of BBC News was saddened by the level, as he felt it disproved his theory that the video game industry had "grown-up". Rock, Paper, Shotgun's Kieron Gillen chastised the level for failing to live up to expectations. He found the plot to be illogical, criticized the skip feature for rendering an artistic statement as "laughably pathetic", and ultimately summarized the level as "dumb shock". Writing for PC World, Matt Peckham questioned why the gunmen would not care if the player did not shoot, and felt that not informing the player of what was about to happen until the last possible moment was "creating a kind of plausible emotional deniability by removing all the dramatic impetus that ought to surround it". Several prominent British religious leaders condemned "No Russian": Alexander Goldberg of the London Jewish Forum was worried that children would play the level; Fazan Mohammed of the British Muslim Forum described the level as an intimate experience of enacting terrorism; and Stephen Lowe, the retired Bishop of Hulme, felt that the level was "sickening".

=== International censorship and game ratings ===
Due to the graphic content featured in "No Russian", some international versions of Call of Duty: Modern Warfare 2 were subject to censorship. Activision removed the level entirely from Russian versions of the game, a decision that was made based on the country's lack of a formal rating system for games. According to Activision: "Russia does not have a formal ratings entity. As a result, we chose to block the scene after seeking the advice of local counsel." Some journalists erroneously reported Call of Duty: Modern Warfare 2 had been banned or recalled in Russia. In Japanese and German versions of the game, the level was edited so that the player would be given a game over screen if they killed any civilians. The Japanese version was criticized by some players for changing Makarov's opening line, "Remember, no Russian", to "Kill them, they are Russians".

Uncensored versions of the game were given a high content rating, such as an M rating by the ESRB in North-America, and an 18 certificate by the BBFC in the UK. Call of Duty: Modern Warfare 2 was the first game in the series to receive an 18 certificate, which the BBFC noted was specifically due to "No Russian". In their game summary, the BBFC wrote: "The evident brutality in this mission does carry a focus on the 'infliction of pain or injury' which, along with the disturbing nature of the scenario it sets up, was felt to be more appropriately placed at the adult category." British Labour Party politician Keith Vaz was "absolutely shocked" by the content of "No Russian", and questioned whether sales of Call of Duty: Modern Warfare 2 should be halted in accordance with the Byron Review. Vaz raised his concerns in the House of Commons, although this had no effect on game sales.

In Australia, Call of Duty: Modern Warfare 2 was rated MA15+ by the Australian Classification Board (ACB). When the video footage of "No Russian" was leaked, the Australian Council on Children and the Media (ACCM) lobbied for a rating reclassification. ACCM president Jane Roberts said: "The consequences of terrorism are just abhorrent in our community and yet here we are with a product that's meant to be passed off as a leisure time activity, actually promoting what most world leaders speak out publicly against." At the time, an MA15+ was the highest rating a video game could receive, and a potentially-higher rating would effectively ban sales of the game. Many Australian gaming publications called for the implementation of an R18+ rating, which was opposed by Attorney-General of South Australia Michael Atkinson, who felt that "No Russian" let players be "virtual terrorists". He sought to appeal the rating and have the game banned, although the ACB never received correspondence from Atkinson.

== Legacy ==
In 2012, Laura Parker of GameSpot discussed how "No Russian" was a watershed moment for the video game industry. She felt that the level raised the question of whether or not it was acceptable to discuss human suffering in video games, and if their status as entertainment products prevented them from doing so. She also commented that if more developers were willing to take risks and include controversial material, then video games would finally receive cultural recognition. Kotaku's Kirk Hamilton wrote that one game that included controversial material was Spec Ops: The Line (2012). During one scene, the player comes across a squadmate who had been lynched by a mob, and the player has the option to either kill the civilians or scare them away with warning shots. Walt Williams, the lead writer for Spec Ops: The Line, remarked that the development team wanted to make the scene feel organic, and explicitly sought to avoid the "clumsiness" of No Russian.

In his book, Playing War: Military Video Games after 9/11, Matthew Payne analyzed three controversial levels from the Call of Duty series, including "No Russian". He suggested that Allen's death emphasized the militainment theme of the soldier who sacrifices themselves for the greater good and that the level rationalizes morally suspect operations as long as they serve under the guise of national security. Payne also commented that while "No Russian" could be seen as a realistic depiction of war when compared to contemporary representations, it could only be viewed in the context of the story, and thus removes any potential of having the player re-examine the precepts of modern warfare. Following the November 2015 Paris attacks, Robert Rath of Zam.com replayed "No Russian" and examined how the level mirrored real-life terrorist attacks. Rath felt that while the plot was absurd, the attack featured in the level was realistic and that it could teach players that terrorist attacks often occur at soft targets.

Reviewing the game Modern Warfare 2 Campaign Remastered in 2020, Wired's Julie Muncy called No Russian "crass and stupid", feeling it had no clear reason to exist and that the horror of its gameplay was forgotten about once over. Phil Hornshaw of GameSpot thought while the level could be seen as Call of Duty at its "most-subversive and artistically-expressive", it failed to convey any interesting ideas. He also wrote that it felt callous following years of mass shootings. Following heavy indication that the then-upcoming Call of Duty: Modern Warfare III (2023) would feature its own version of "No Russian", PCGamesN's Jack Ridsdale questioned whether it was wise for the series to revisit the level and if it could be as provocative as the original.

"No Russian" has been linked to some real premeditated attacks. Following the 2011 Domodedovo International Airport bombing, the Russian state-owned television network RT broadcast a report that juxtaposed security camera footage of the attack with gameplay footage from "No Russian". The reporter stated that the level was reminiscent of the bombing, and quoted Fox News analyst Walid Phares as saying terrorists could be using video games as training tools. In 2013, a student from Albany, Oregon, was detained by police for plotting to attack his high school with explosives and firearms. Notebooks found by police detailed how the student planned to use napalm grenades, and to play the theme song from "No Russian" in his car during the shooting. The perpetrator of the 2011 Norway attacks, Anders Behring Breivik, called Call of Duty: Modern Warfare 2 a "training-simulation", and some journalists commented on a potential link between the attacks and "No Russian". The level was not explicitly referred to in Breivik's manifesto however, and media scholar Gareth Schott argues journalists ignored the majority of the manifesto and instead used video games as a scapegoat.

"No Russian" reappears in the game's sequel, Call of Duty: Modern Warfare 3 (2011) during a flashback scene where the game's playable character, Yuri, reveals to Captain Price that he had attempted to stop the massacre, but failed. The version of "No Russian" featured in Modern Warfare 2 Campaign Remastered (2020) was updated to account for this scene. Similarly to the original game, this version of the game was not sold in Russia, which journalists speculated to be due to "No Russian." The level is referred to in the rebooted Modern Warfare series, specifically Call of Duty: Modern Warfare II (2022) and Call of Duty: Modern Warfare III (2023), with the latter featuring a mission inspired by it.
