= Captain Price =

Character from the Call of Duty franchise

- Call of Duty character
- Captain Price as he appears in Call of Duty: Modern Warfare 3 (2011)
- First game: Call of Duty 4: Modern Warfare (2007)
- Voiced by: Billy Murray (2007–2011); Barry Sloane (2019–2026)

In-universe information
- Title(s): Lieutenant (1996; original continuity) (2011; reboot continuity); Captain
- Affiliation: British Army (22nd SAS Regiment); Task Force 141
- Nationality: English

Captain John Price is a character from the Call of Duty series of video games published by Activision. First appearing in Call of Duty 4: Modern Warfare (2007) as Captain of the 22nd SAS Regiment, he later joins the international special operations unit Task Force 141. He has appeared in every game in both the original Modern Warfare sub-series and its reboot series, the latter beginning in 2019 with Call of Duty: Modern Warfare. In the original trilogy, he is voiced by Billy Murray; in the reboot series, he is voiced by Barry Sloane.

Captain Price is based on another character of the same name that appeared in the original Call of Duty (2003), set in World War II. When designing the character for Call of Duty 4, the development team overhauled the original design from the 2003 game, incorporating elements such as a thousand-yard stare, a weathered boonie hat, and a receding hairline. Price is widely considered to be the most iconic character in the Call of Duty series and is considered by some as one of the most iconic video game characters of all time. Critics have praised his role in the series, and the character has ranked in reader polls for the best video game characters of all time.

== Creation and design ==
The design of Captain Price was heavily inspired by another Call of Duty character named Captain Price, who appeared in the original 2003 Call of Duty game and its sequel Call of Duty 2 (2005). These games were set during World War II, and the first game saw that Captain Price die in battle while infiltrating a Nazi battleship. In an interview with Infinity Ward community manager Robert Bowling, he stated that during the develop of Call of Duty 4: Modern Warfare (2007), they wanted to give the character "a fresh new look," making his design to "look like a character", and allowing his actions in-game to "make him a hero". While that game's Captain Price already had a beard, the developers chose to make it scruffy as to make it fit better with his face and "give him a grizzlier look." His face is asymmetrical, and he has a receding hairline along with a bald spot. The team spent an extensive amount of time working on his eyes and boonie hat, giving him the appearance of a thousand-yard stare complete with a shadow over his eyes from the deformed hat. According to Infinity Ward character designer Sami Onur in an interview, Captain Price is the grandson of the original Captain Price from the first Call of Duty game. However, him being the grandson of that game's Captain Price has never officially been confirmed.

In the original Modern Warfare trilogy, Captain Price is voiced by Billy Murray. In the reboot series, starting with Call of Duty: Modern Warfare (2019), he is voiced by Barry Sloane, who also does motion capturing for the character.

== Appearances ==
=== Original trilogy ===
First appearing in Call of Duty 4, Price serves as the commanding officer of the 22nd Special Air Service Regiment investigating a recent civil war that has broken out in Russia. This unit includes the protagonist and main playable character; Scottish Sergeant John "Soap" MacTavish. In two of the game's missions, "All Ghillied Up" and "One Shot, One Kill", the player takes control of Price in 1996 (when he was a Lieutenant under his superior, Captain MacMillan) as he attempts to assassinate the game's primary antagonist, Imran Zakhaev. In the game's final mission, Price is heavily injured in a standoff against Zakhaev and his men, though Soap manages to kill Zakhaev. Between the events of Call of Duty 4 and Call of Duty: Modern Warfare 2 (2009), Price and a few other SAS operatives join a new multinational special operations unit formed by General Shepherd named Task Force 141. The ultra-nationalists win the Russian Civil War, canonise Zakhaev as a national hero and arrest Captain Price, giving him the prisoner number "Prisoner #627".

In Modern Warfare 2, which takes place five years later, Price first appears after Soap helps him escape a gulag in Kamchatka Krai, Russia. Shortly after, Price rejoins the 141 unit. Under the orders of General Shepherd, the new head of the United States Army, the unit's main objective is to hunt down and kill ultra-nationalist Vladimir Makarov. Price, against orders, launches an ICBM containing nuclear warheads from a Russian naval base and detonates it over the East Coast of the United States, giving the U.S. Army a vital assist in regaining control of Washington D.C. Shepherd, with a blank cheque provided by the Secretary of Defense, deploys Task Force 141 to assassinate Makarov. The ulterior motives of Shepherd, however, are to cover up his collusion with Makarov in the massacre on Zakhaev Airport, and to start World War III with the intention of commanding of an army to win it; reshaping his legacy as a war hero after losing "30,000 men in the blink of an eye" in a nuclear explosion. As part of his plan, he assassinates 141 operatives Ghost and Roach before framing Price and Soap as war criminals. In the game's climax, Price and Soap shoot down Shepherd's helicopter in Afghanistan; a battle ensues between the three that leaves Price badly beaten, Soap impaled, and Shepherd dead via a knife to his left eye.

In Call of Duty: Modern Warfare 3 (2011), Task Force 141 has been disavowed by Western governments; Price resultantly spends the majority of the game as a fugitive from them alongside Soap, Nikolai and ex-Spetsnaz soldier Yuri, as they hunt down Vladimir Makarov during World War III. During a mission to assassinate Makarov in Prague, Soap is seriously wounded in an explosion; before dying, Soap reveals that Makarov knows Yuri. An incandescent Price, demanding information, discovers that they had previously worked together for the Russian Ultranationalists; Yuri had become disillusioned by their senseless killing and tried to stop the attack on Zakhaev Airport, betraying Makarov in the process. Deciding to continue trusting him, Price, Yuri and Nikolai track Makarov down to a hotel on the Arabian Peninsula. The latter, distracted from being shot by Yuri (who himself is fatally shot) is hanged by Price from the hotel's broken ceiling. Having avenged Soap and Yuri and ended Makarov's reign of terror, Price lights a cigar as distant sirens are heard.

=== Reboot series ===
Captain Price reappears in Call of Duty: Modern Warfare (2019), a reboot of the original Modern Warfare games. He first appears after being called in by Station Chief Kate Laswell, to deal with an incident involving a group of insurgents in the fictional country of Urzikstan seizing a shipment of chemical gas weapons. A mission set ten years before the events of the game sees Price free the resistance leader Farah Karim from imprisonment by Russian General Roman Barkov, who in the present occupies Urzikstan. At the end of the game, Price and Karim, with the assistance of Gaz, Nikolai and Alex, kill Barkov.

In a post-credits scene, Price proposes the creation of Task Force 141 to Laswell during a private meeting, with characters such as Ghost, Soap, and Gaz as its proposed members, setting up the events of Call of Duty: Modern Warfare II (2022) and Call of Duty: Modern Warfare III (2023).

In Call of Duty: Modern Warfare 4 (2026), Price chases down "The Archer", eventually leading to the death of the two characters, making Ghost the only known remaining active and alive member of Task Force 141.

=== Other appearances ===
Captain Price also makes an appearance in Call of Duty: Black Ops Cold War (2020) as a playable character. His design in Black Ops: Cold War is reminiscent of his appearance in the Call of Duty 4 mission "Crew Expendable", which has him in all-black gear. This variant of his design also replaces his boonie hat with a gas mask. He also appears in Call of Duty: Mobile and Call of Duty: Online.

== Reception ==
Captain Price has been often referred to as the most iconic character in the Call of Duty series, as well as amongst the best-written. Captain Price was named one of the most iconic video game characters by the editorial staff of GamesRadar+, with another list from Glixel naming him one of the most iconic characters of the 21st century. He has ranked on reader polls conducted by Guinness World Records and the editorial staff of Game Informer, with the former having over 13,000 respondents and the latter having over 70,000. Meagan Marie of Game Informer considered Captain Price to be one of the most memorable designs for video game characters, writing that while most people remembered the character for his "selfless nature and unique personality," the design of him made it where Captain Price "never feels lost in the crowd."

In a retrospective video highlighting the history of the character throughout the series, Ian Higton of Eurogamer described Captain Price as the "true star" of the Call of Duty series, further claiming him to be the "most famous mustachioed military man of all time". Citing the voice actor for Price in beta builds of Call of Duty 4 to be the same as the original Call of Duty character, Higton highlighted a theory that claims Captain Price to be a time traveler. He compared Price to Sam Beckett from Quantum Leap, describing Price as "leaping from time period to time period, taking out Nazis and terrorists, wherever he's needed the most". The editorial staff of GamesRadar+ described Captain Price as being a "badass", and that "arguably no other character in the history of games goes harder" than him.

In 2021, GameRant reported that a study conducted by Top10Casinos found Captain Price to be the most attractive male character in video games via a "Golden Ratio", in which he scored a 88.90%, which surpassed Geralt of Rivia in second place by 2%. According to TheGamer, the study was met with fierce backlash from the fandoms of numerous other video games on social media, arguing for other characters to have been more deserving of the top spot.

=== Analysis ===
Writing about his role in the Modern Warfare reboot, Jeremy Peel of Rock Paper Shotgun highlighted Captain Price's choice to make sacrifices and commit various acts –getting "dirty" so the world can be "clean". He highlighted a scene where Price offers to take over the role of escorting the wife and child of a terrorist to an interrogation room to be used as "leverage"—thus providing the player a choice to "stay clean". He described Price as an example of "decisive utilitarianism", and compared his actions to be resolving the in-game equivalent of the trolley problem, where one person has to die so that many more can be saved. He compared his character to being that of "Santa with an assault rifle."

Media researcher George Blackburn believed that the relationships between MacMillan, Price, and MacTavish were akin to that of a patriarchal family dynamic. He cited the repeated appearances of older commanders directing younger officers throughout the games, affectionately addressing them as "sons". Another media researcher, Claudius Stemmler, described Price as a character primarily driven by revenge, similar to the antagonists of the series. He found this to be reflected by every mission in the games culminating in a killing of a villain, satisfying the potential wish of revenge on the part of the player as well as Price; when Shepherd, Makarov, and Price disagree on who should actually write history, Price insists that "all history is lies", but later stresses that he wants to kill Shepherd "for the record".

== Sources ==
- Blackburn, Gregory (2018). "Army Men: Military Masculinity in Call of Duty". Masculinities in Play. Cham: Springer International Publishing. pp. 37–53. doi:10.1007/978-3-319-90581-5_3. ISBN 978-3-319-90580-8.
- Stemmler, Claudius (2017). "New Media, Same Stale Ideology: Recurring Themes and Global Representations in the Modern Warfare Trilogy". In Garrelts, N.; Kapell, M.W. (eds.). Responding to Call of Duty: Critical Essays on the Game Franchise. Studies in Gaming. McFarland, Incorporated, Publishers. pp. 51–63. ISBN 978-1-4766-6875-8.
