= Call of Duty: Infinite Warfare =

2016 video game

- Developer: Infinity Ward
- Publisher: Activision
- Director: Jordan Hirsh
- Producer: Jack Hara
- Designers: Andrew Thompson; Jacob Minkoff
- Programmer: Daniel Nelson
- Artists: Brian Horton; Riccard Linde
- Writers: Taylor Kurosaki; Brian Bloom
- Composer: Sarah Schachner
- Series: Call of Duty
- Engine: IW 7.0
- Platforms: PlayStation 4; Windows; Xbox One
- Release: November 4, 2016
- Genre: First-person shooter
- Modes: Single-player, multiplayer

Call of Duty: Infinite Warfare is a 2016 first-person shooter game developed by Infinity Ward and published by Activision. It is the thirteenth installment in the Call of Duty series and was released worldwide for PlayStation 4, Windows, and Xbox One on November 4, 2016.

Development of Infinite Warfare began during 2014. It is the first title by Infinity Ward under the new three-year development cycle for the Call of Duty series. The game's campaign is centered around a war for the Solar System, which the Settlement Defense Front (SDF), a hostile force who are the main antagonists, are attempting to take over. The player takes control of Lieutenant Nick Reyes of the Special Combat Air Recon (SCAR). They have their own transforming fighter, named "Jackal", that they can customize as well as a central hub ship named Retribution.

Infinite Warfare's announcement trailer was noted for its strong negative reaction; at the time, it was the second-most disliked video on YouTube. Commentators attributed this to Call of Duty fans expressing frustration at the sci-fi direction the series had taken, specifically that the game and its predecessors had futuristic settings. Special editions of Infinite Warfare were released with a remastered version of Call of Duty 4: Modern Warfare, titled Call of Duty: Modern Warfare Remastered.

The game received generally positive reviews upon release, receiving praise for its gameplay, characters, and Zombies mode, but criticism for its multiplayer mode, while its single-player campaign received mixed opinions. Nevertheless, retrospective reviewers have praised the campaign as one of Call of Duty's finest. It has generally been placed below the top 10 on lists ranking the series' games. It was named as Best Shooter at E3 by Game Informer and was nominated for several awards. While Infinite Warfare underperformed in sales compared to previous Call of Duty titles, it was both the top-selling game in the US and UK in November 2016.

== Gameplay ==
=== Campaign ===
In zero-gravity environments, players can use a grappling hook to quickly navigate the environment.

Similar to the previous games in the series, Infinite Warfare is a first-person shooter. As the game introduces a new setting, outer space, new gameplay mechanics, such as zero-gravity environments, are included. Players are equipped with a boost pack, and a grappling hook, which allow players to move in these zero-gravity environments easily. As the game is set in space, players can visit different planets, satellites and asteroids in the Solar System.

Assuming control of Captain Nick Reyes, a Tier 1 Special Operations pilot, players engage in aerial combat with enemies using his transforming fighter, the Jackal. Aerial combat is not on-rail, as players can freely control the Jackal with few limitations. According to Infinity Ward, both space combat, and the franchise's signature "boots-on-the-ground" gameplay are the game's key focuses. Transition between space combat and boots-on-the-ground combat is seamless with no loading screen.

Players gain access to Retribution, a central hub world. In Retribution, players can view their progression, and start main campaign missions, and secondary quests called "Ship Assaults" which gives them cosmetic and customization items, upgrades to the Jackal, as well as new story details. Reyes also has a wrist computer, which allows him to hack into enemies' gadgets and machines such as robots. It can also be used to call in reinforcements at some campaign scenarios. The game also features two new difficulty modes, Specialist and #YOLO, unlockable after initial completion of the campaign. In the former mode, health regeneration does not occur without Nano Shots, and weapons can be shot out from players' hands. Reyes' movement will be hindered if his legs are shot by enemies. In the latter mode, which also implements the same features from Specialist, when players die, they need to restart the game rather than restarting from checkpoints.

=== Multiplayer ===
Infinite Warfare introduces a major overhaul to the class system called the "Combat Rigs". Similar to the Specialist system in Black Ops III, there are six rigs in total, being Warfighter, Merc, FTL, Stryker, Phantom and Synaptic. All of which have different payloads, weapons, abilities and playstyles. For example, the Synaptic rig is designed for players who prefer to run and gun, while the Phantom rig is suited for players who want to play stealthily. Players can also gain access to several persistent perks, known as "Traits", which give players advantages in certain combat situations. Additionally, the game retains the chain-based momentum movement system of Black Ops III, allowing players to perform thrust jumps, sliding, and wallrunning.

The game features hundreds of both primary and secondary weapons. Players can gain access to several types of weapons, including traditional ballistic weapons and melee weapons, futuristic energy weapons, and different kinds of grenades, such as the Seeker Grenade and the Black Hole Grenade. Players can add attachments on them to enhance their efficiency. The game also introduces a new weapon crafting system. In a multiplayer match, players earn "Salvage" points, which can be consumed to purchase Prototype Weapons, variants of existing in-game weapons. For each gun, there are four types of prototypes, classified into four groups, namely Common, Rare, Legendary and Epic, all of which grant players gameplay advantages known as the "Gun Perks". Scorestreaks return in Infinite Warfare for players who have earned sufficient points in a match. Scoresteaks offer players perks such as the ability to deploy UAV and counter-UAV, and the ability to summon a R-C8 robot, an armored robot designed to defend the player and kill other opponents.

=== Zombies ===
The game also features a cooperative multiplayer Zombies mode, which has its own gameplay mechanics and story, separate from the campaign. The mode is designed to be more accessible to new players, with new features such as sharing points and team-buy doors, as well as keeping the core gameplay of the mode intact, such as perks and power-ups. A new feature, Fate and Fortune Cards, is introduced similarly to the Gobblegums in Call of Duty: Black Ops III; the cards offer temporary boosts in-game to the players, but unlike Gobblegums they are activated through point earning, and players can select any of the five cards they have equipped at any time, not one at a time like the Gobblegum machine. After initial use of five cards, players can refill their card deck for a price up to two times in a match. Unlike the campaign and multiplayer modes, Zombies is not themed in space combat, and retains the normal movement system.

== Synopsis ==
=== Characters and settings ===
Infinite Warfare takes place in the distant future after Earth's natural resources are exhausted due to population growth and industry. Nations unite to form the United Nations Space Alliance (UNSA), overseeing trade, travel, and space colonization. Earth's residents depend on colonies elsewhere in the Solar System for resources, attracting radicals who aim to control these outposts, thereby risking conflict. The Solar Associated Treaty Organization (SATO) defends Earth and UNSA. Thirty years before the events of the game, a hostile faction called the Settlement Defense Front (SDF), a totalitarian group of former UNSA colonies, emerges on Mars and secedes from Earth after successfully fighting a war of independence. After years of conflict, relations between the UNSA and the SDF worsen, risking war across the Solar System.

As the newly appointed captain of the UNSA Warship Retribution, Commander Nick Reyes (Brian Bloom), a Tier 1 Special Operations pilot of the Special Combat Air Recon (SCAR), is tasked to lead a crew to defeat the Settlement Defense Front on Earth, as well as journey to outer space and across other planets in the system using space-based fighter craft, referred to as Jackals, to stop the Front from taking over the entire Solar System. Assisting Reyes in the fight against the SDF are his mentor Admiral Fredrick Raines (John Marshall Jones), Reyes' wingman and best friend Lieutenant Nora Salter (Jamie Gray Hyder), his robot sidekick E3N "Ethan" (Jeffrey Nordling), and the SATO Marines including Staff Sergeant Usef Omar (David Harewood), Corporal Sean Brooks (Jason Barry) and Private Todd Kashima (Eric Ladin). Other notable allies include Retribution Navigator Victor "Gator" Diallo (Omid Abtahi), Tigris warship captain Maureen Ferran (Claudia Christian), and Retribution Chief Engineer Audrey "Mac" MaCallum (Claudia Black). Facing Reyes and his allies in battle is the commander of the starship Olympus Mons, and leader of the SDF, Rear Admiral Salen Kotch (Kit Harington), and his senior commander Akeel Min Riah (Jim Pirri). UFC fighter Conor McGregor makes a cameo appearance as SDF Captain Bradley Fillion, while Formula One driver Lewis Hamilton appears as Retribution Electro-technical Officer Carl Hamilton.

=== Campaign ===
Sometime in the distant future, a UNSA space forces team is sent to a secret UNSA weapons research facility on Europa where a prototype weapon is being developed, resulting in the SDF seizing the installation. The UNSA team recovers the prototype and initiates the facility's self-destruct, but are captured by the SDF and subsequently executed by Admiral Kotch.

On Earth, Reyes tells Admiral Raines that the SDF attack is a declaration of war, and UNSA should respond, but Raines refuses because the leaders want to avoid escalation, especially during Fleet Week in Geneva, where all the UNSA ships are gathered. Reyes joins Salter and meets the experimental autonomous robot E3N (nicknamed "Ethan"). Suddenly, SDF hijacks UNSA AATIS cannons and fires on the fleet, while an SDF force invades Geneva. Reyes fights to the AATIS control tower, disables the cannons, and captures Riah, the SDF spy. He then joins the surviving ships against the SDF fleet until the SDF flagship, Olympus Mons, arrives and destroys the ships before retreating with only two ships surviving: the carrier Retribution, where Reyes is stationed, and the destroyer Tigris.

Upon landing on the Retribution, Reyes learns that both the ship's captain and the executive officer were killed in battle, making him the highest-ranking officer and its de facto captain. Admiral Raines promotes Reyes to commander and orders him to retake the cargo port on the Moon from the SDF. After liberating the Moon, Reyes is tasked with delaying the SDF until the UNSA can rebuild its fleet. He can then undertake optional missions to attack key SDF targets and a refueling tower on Titan, crippling the SDF's fuel supply. Reyes and Ethan nearly perish during the latter mission, but are rescued by the Tigris. Later, he investigates a disturbance at an asteroid mining station near Mercury, only to find it was a diversion while the SDF destroys the Tigris, leaving the Retribution as the only remaining UNSA ship.

Learning that Riah is carrying a beacon meant to signal the main SDF fleet to invade Earth, Reyes devises a plan to use the beacon to lure the SDF fleet right into the still-operational AATIS guns. The plan backfires when Riah escapes, destroys the AATIS guns, and kills himself to trigger the beacon. The SDF arrives, and the Olympus Mons destroys the UNSA headquarters, killing Admiral Raines.

With no other options, Reyes boards and seizes the Olympus Mons. Enraged, Kotch sets his ship to self-destruct, aiming to destroy Geneva and weaken SATO. Reyes fights to the bridge, kills Kotch, and stops the self-destruct. He then takes the Olympus Mons and Retribution to Mars, planning to destroy the SDF's orbital shipyard and fleet. The Olympus Mons is heavily damaged, with weapons unusable. Reyes orders it to ram the shipyard, causing the Retribution to also sustain damage and drift into the Olympus Mons flight path. Both ships crash onto Mars, leaving the shipyard intact.

Reyes, realizing they cannot return to Earth, rallies the Retribution crew for a final desperate attack on the shipyard. Most are killed, but Reyes, Salter, Ethan, and a few others reach the shipyard, commandeer a destroyer whose weapons are disabled and mooring clamps locked. Ethan sacrifices himself to destroy the moorings, while Reyes unlocks the weapons and orders Salter to destroy the shipyard. Salter reluctantly opens fire, ejecting Reyes into space. Reyes watches the shipyard explode before shrapnel punctures his suit, causing him to suffocate.

Later, the UNSA honors Reyes and the Retribution crew for destroying the SDF shipyard, calling it a decisive victory that wiped out the SDF. Salter, one of only four survivors who managed to make it back to Earth, salutes a Geneva war memorial listing all UNSA soldiers killed, including Reyes.

=== Zombies ===
No.	Title	Original release date
1	"Zombies in Spaceland"	November 4, 2016
Some time before the events of the game, horror film director Willard Wyler (Paul Reubens) lost his wife Alexandra to leukemia, straining his relationship with his daughter Winona. Wyler later made a deal with the demonic Mephistopheles (Fred Tatasciore), and unwillingly became his servant, forced to collect souls by sending them into alternate dimensions formed from his films, leading them to their deaths by monsters of his creation. Over time, Wyler felt guilt for condemning countless victims, including Winona, to their doom, and secretly forms a plan to recruit actors who could enter his films and fight back, free Wyler from his prison, and defeat Mephistopheles. After decades of elusive retirement, Wyler prepares for his comeback into the movie business. He invites four aspiring actors — Andre Wright (Jay Pharoah), Aaron "A.J." Jordaniels (Ike Barinholtz), Poindexter Zittermann (Seth Green), and Sally Simpson (Sasheer Zamata) — to his theater for an audition, but unbeknownst to them, he intends to trap the four inside one of his own movies, "Zombies in Spaceland". The four actors find themselves in an 80's theme park, dressed as archetypes of the era. As the four try to survive the oncoming zombie horde, they find unexpected help from famous actor David Hasselhoff, who is also trapped in the movie as his Knight Rider character Michael Knight. With Hasselhoff's aid, the four actors manage to fend off the undead, much to Wyler's chagrin, and discover a piece of an artifact known as the Soul Key.
2	"Rave in the Redwoods"	January 31, 2017
As the actors attempt to escape, they instead find themselves in another one of Wyler's films, "Rave in the Redwoods", set in a '90s campsite in the Redwood National and State Parks, where they go up against hordes of undead raver teenagers and sasquatches. As the actors traverse across the campsite, they encounter director Kevin Smith, who has also been trapped here for an amount of time with his friend Jason Mewes. Kevin reveals that Jason died prior to the actors' arrival in the film at the hands of the chainsaw-wielding Slasher, who lurks around the campsite. The actors help Kevin recover his memory, and convince him to help them escape the film. However, the group soon uncovers through the memories that Jason, along with various other victims associated with Wyler, was killed by Kevin who was unknowingly the Slasher all along. Kevin, as he fully recovers his memories, is forced to transform into the Slasher to kill the actors, but is defeated.
3	"Shaolin Shuffle"	April 18, 2017
The actors retrieve the second piece of the Soul Key, and are immediately warped into Wyler's third film, "Shaolin Shuffle", set in the backdrop of a '70s New York City. The group, now dressed in 70s apparel, find help from actress Pam Grier, who operates a martial arts dojo in the film. Pam assists the actors in fighting Wyler's zombie horde, by giving them special martial arts skills and training. The group encounter Arthur McIntosh, a failed businessman who after consuming a mysterious chemical became the Rat King, capable of controlling sewer rats at his will. The actors and Pam battle McIntosh and manage to kill him, while also retrieving the third piece of the Soul Key.
4	"Attack of the Radioactive Thing"	July 6, 2017
The four actors are then teleported into Wyler's fourth film, "Attack of the Radioactive Thing", set in a 1950s beach area affected by a radioactive experiment. The actors encounter horror film hostess Elvira (Cassandra Peterson), who is also trapped inside this film, and proceed to assist her in her plan to foil Wyler's scheme. Together, they battle against a combined force of zombies as well as mutant crab-frog fusions and a giant radioactive beast dubbed Crogzilla. The crew assemble a nuclear bomb and detonate it inside the Crogzilla's belly, blowing it to bits. They then retrieve the fourth piece of the Soul Key inside the Crogzilla's eye.
5	"The Beast from Beyond"	September 12, 2017
The four actors are then teleported into the final film, "The Beast from Beyond", as they arrive at a futuristic military station on an ice planet, where they battle against the Cryptid aliens from the Extinction series, as well as a mixture of zombies from the previous four films. After fighting against a herd of Cryptids, the four retrieve the final piece of the Soul Key, and are seemingly teleported back to Wyler's theater, where he joyfully greets them. Without letting him explain himself, the four actors furiously send Wyler back into the Spaceland movie using his own method, but ultimately realize they have become slaves to the demon Mephistopheles in Wyler's place. Mephistopheles himself appears in front of the four actors, and threatens to consume their souls; the four then arm themselves for a final battle against the demon. After seemingly winning against him, the four are teleported back to the theater, but still find themselves unable to escape. In reality, it is revealed that they are already trapped inside the Soul Jar, which contains pocket universes representing the theater as well as each of Wyler's films. Meanwhile, Wyler enlists Hasselhoff's help in Spaceland once more in an attempt to escape the movie. He reunites with the four actors and reconciles with them as all five begin to plot their next move.

== Development and release ==
I want people to play our new game and say, 'Wow, I haven't seen [Call of Duty] change that much since Call of Duty 4: Modern Warfare.

— Jacob Minkoff, a design director at Infinity Ward

In 2014, Activision announced a three-year development cycle for the Call of Duty series, in which Infinity Ward, Sledgehammer Games and Treyarch would take turns in releasing a Call of Duty video game every year so as to extend each game's development time. Infinite Warfare is the third and the last game in the first cycle, and it is the first video game developed by Infinity Ward since 2013's Call of Duty: Ghosts. Development for the game dates as far back as 2014. According to Infinity Ward, the development team added many new ideas to the game, and put emphasis on the game's storytelling. The team chose space as the game's setting as they believed that it can introduce new environments to players. To make the game more realistic, Infinity Ward had consulted several military experts. The team also wanted to start an Infinite Warfare sub-series.

=== Reveal ===
In February 2016, Activision announced that Infinity Ward would be the lead developer of 2016's Call of Duty game. Infinite Warfare was officially confirmed by Activision when they announced that the company would not have a booth at E3 2016, and that their products would be shown through their partner, Sony Interactive Entertainment. Activision teased the game with a video, titled "Know Your Enemy", and a new ending for Black Ops III's "Nuk3town" map, which shows a giant airship on top of the map. The game was leaked via PlayStation Store on April 26, and the first trailer was revealed unofficially via Hulu prior to the game's official announcement.

In May 2016, Activision released the official announcement trailer for the game, a week after they trademarked the name of the game. The trailer of the game was officially revealed through a live-stream on Twitch. As part of the reveal, Activision ran a social media game using a Facebook chat bot, which tasks the player to decode a message. A remastered version of Call of Duty 4: Modern Warfare, entitled Modern Warfare Remastered, was released on PlayStation 4, Xbox One and PC alongside Infinite Warfare, only available with the purchase of either the Legacy, Digital Deluxe or Legacy Pro edition of Infinite Warfare. The first public piece of gameplay for the Infinite Warfare campaign was revealed as a trailer during the Sony press conference at E3 2016. A gameplay video of the "Black Sky" campaign mission was revealed at San Diego Comic-Con on July 21, 2016. Also revealed was the "Terminal" map pre-order bonus for customers who pre-ordered Infinite Warfare.

In August 2016, Activision sent mysterious metal packages to YouTubers in the Call of Duty community. Each came with a combination lock and a countdown timer. A code was sent to all recipients to open the boxes once the timer reached 1 minute. Each box contained a variety of 80's-themed apparel, plus a cassette player and a VHS tape, which contained the reveal trailer for Zombies in Spaceland. An HD version of the trailer was released hours after, along with a reveal of the game's new mechanics, as well as the "Zombies in Spaceland" bonus preorder pack, which contains a weapon camouflage, an animated player card, as well as a "Fate and Fortune Card Pack" for use in the Zombies mode. The official reveal of Infinite Warfare's multiplayer mode took place during the Call of Duty XP 2016 convention, which was held in early September 2016.

=== Multiplayer beta ===
A multiplayer beta for people who pre-ordered the PlayStation 4 version of the game began on October 14. An Xbox One beta began on October 21, and the PC version did not have a beta. The beta concluded on October 24.

=== Downloadable content ===
Players who purchased the season pass, whether separately or with certain special editions of the game, received all four DLC packs for Infinite Warfare, released in four waves during 2017, for a slightly discounted price (compared to that of all DLC packs purchased separately). Season pass holders also received 1,000 Salvage credits, the game's in-game currency, and 10 rare quality supply drops at the game's launch.

The first DLC pack, named Sabotage, was available to PS4 players on January 31, 2017, and to Xbox One and PC players on March 2. The pack includes the new Zombies map "Rave in the Redwoods", as well as four new multiplayer maps: "Noir", "Renaissance", "Neon", and "Dominion" (remade from the Modern Warfare 2 map "Afghan"). The second map pack, Continuum, was released on PS4 on April 18 and on Xbox One and PC on May 18; the map pack includes four MP maps: "Turista", "Scrap", "Archive", "Excess" (a remake of the MW2 map "Rust"), and one Zombies map, "Shaolin Shuffle". The third map pack, Absolution, was released on PS4 on July 6 and on Xbox One and PC on August 8; the map pack features the Zombies map "Attack of the Radioactive Thing" and four MP maps: "Permafrost", "Fore", "Bermuda", and "Ember" (a remake of the MW3 map "Resistance"). The final map pack, Retribution, was released on PS4 on September 12 and features the final Zombies episode, "The Beast from Beyond", as well as four MP maps: "Carnage", "Altitude", "Depot 22", and "Heartland" (a remake of the Ghosts map "Warhawk").

In addition to map packs, Infinite Warfare also features announcer voice packs, replacing the regular voice-over in multiplayer with other voices. A voice pack called "UK Special Forces" was released for free to all players, featuring the voice of actor Craig Fairbrass (also known for his role as Gaz in Modern Warfare, Ghost in Modern Warfare 2, Wallcroft in Modern Warfare 3, and Tee in Infinite Warfare). Other voice packs feature various celebrities, including rapper Method Man, YouTuber Ozzy Man Reviews, and comedian Ken Jeong.

== Reception ==
Reception

Aggregate score
Aggregator	Score
Metacritic	(PC) 73/100 (PS4) 77/100 (XONE) 78/100

Review scores
Publication	Score
Computer Games Magazine	6.5/10
Destructoid	7/10
Electronic Gaming Monthly	3/5
Game Informer	9/10
GameRevolution	4/5
GameSpot	8/10
GamesRadar+	4/5
GamesTM	5/10
Giant Bomb	3/5
IGN	7.7/10
PC Gamer (US)	48/100
Polygon	8.5/10
Push Square	6/10
VideoGamer.com	9/10

=== Pre-release ===
Upon release of the initial trailer, the game was heavily criticized by the community for being too futuristic. The consensus held was that this had stemmed from frustration with the current direction of the franchise, as consecutive installments released in the past few years had been set in future settings and narratives. In response to the criticism, Activision CEO Eric Hirshberg stated that he knew "that there are people in our community who are nostalgic for the 'boots-on-the-ground-style gameplay' ... [but] ... we also have millions of people in our community who want to have new innovative experiences in the game each year and Infinite Warfare is going to deliver that." He also stated that Call of Duty: Black Ops II, whose trailer also received its fair share of dislikes, would go on to become the best-selling Call of Duty game at the time. Before dislike counts were removed from YouTube's API on December 13, 2021, the trailer has received more than 3.96 million dislikes and is the 25th-most-disliked video on YouTube.

Despite its pre-release criticism, Infinite Warfare was named Best Shooter at E3 by Game Informer. At the 2016 Game Critics Awards for the best of E3, the game was nominated for Best Action Game, but lost to rival game Battlefield 1.

=== Post-release ===
Call of Duty: Infinite Warfare received "generally favorable" reviews for the PlayStation 4 and Xbox One, while the PC version received "mixed or average" reviews, according to review aggregator website Metacritic.

IGN gave the game a 7.7 out of 10 stating; "Despite its shift to interplanetary combat, Call of Duty: Infinite Warfare is a generally fun but inessential shooter." Trusted Reviews awarded Infinite Warfare 4 and a half out of 5 stars, reasoning; "A solid campaign and the excellent "Zombies" mode will see people stick around for a good while".

The single-player campaign received mixed reviews. Trusted Reviews praised it as the latest example of the improving quality of Call of Duty campaigns in recent years, complimenting the "immersive experience" thanks to an almost complete lack of loading screens, although they felt the narrative was "a bit thin". GamesRadar+ praised the dark and realistic tone, and thought the game was a departure from the typical sense of heroism in the series. Game Informer thought that Infinite Warfare still included some of the series' usual elements but carried greater emotional weight than its predecessors. The story and characters received particular praise; Polygon and GameRevolution write the characters were the "strongest" and "most memorable" in the series, with Polygon feeling the writing for a Call of Duty campaign had never been bettered. IGN appreciated the dialogue and cast performances. GameSpot also praised the characters and compared the game's structure to a film, in contrast to past instalments that felt like an episodic series. GamesTM criticized the lack on interactions during the sequences in single-player. Push Square called the game's single-player "stellar", though stated that multiplayer had come "crashing down" and that adding microtransactions is unacceptable.

EGM, however, panned the narrative as one of the worst they'd experienced in some time; they criticized the characterization of Kotch and Kit Harrington's "lifeless acting", as well as the supporting characters' arcs that they felt were "rushed to an uncomfortable degree"; both EGM and IGN highlighted an example when Omar expresses his dislike of Ethan, but has bonded with him without explanation by the next mission. IGN wrote the campaign was "slow and plodding" and only marginally better than Call of Duty: Ghosts, which they saw as a low point of the franchise. Destructoid called the campaign "average", thinking only fans of Mass Effect and sci-fi would be swayed by it.

Game Informer was pleased from a perception that the "frenetic" movement of gameplay in recent Call of Duty installments had been toned down for Infinite Warfare and harkened back to the series' older style. While EGM enjoyed the variety of gameplay in space, they felt that at times it was unclear as to where the player was meant to go or what their objectives were. Destructoid felt that some of the gadgets used in the game were more entertaining in multiplayer. The game's multiplayer was criticized by Trusted Reviews, writing they were saddened that it was not on par with previous entries.

Jeff Gerstmann said in their review for Giant Bomb that the game is "not long or replayable enough to warrant a full-priced purchase on its own".

Cole Watson in their review for Computer Games Magazine said Call of Duty: Infinite Warfare is "the most disappointing multiplayer shooter" they had played in recent memory.

=== Sales ===
Infinite Warfare sold 1.8 million copies in its first week in the United States. However, overall sales were down 50% compared to 2015's Call of Duty: Black Ops III. Activision was reported to be expecting sales to be down due to the fact that Infinite Warfare was going to be a "new sub-series" and that the Black Ops name carried brand weight with it. Despite slow initial sales, Infinite Warfare was the top-selling game in the US in November 2016. Activision reported in February 2017 that the game missed their sales expectations with one of the reasons cited being that the game "didn't resonate with fans".

The PlayStation 4 version sold 105,764 copies within its first week on sale in Japan, making it the bestselling game of the week in the country.

== Accolades ==
Year	Award	Category	Result	Ref.
2016	Game Critics Awards 2016	Best Action Game	Nominated	
2017	15th Annual Visual Effects Society Awards	Outstanding Visual Effects in a Real-Time Project	Nominated	
2017	15th Annual Visual Effects Society Awards	Outstanding Animated Performance in an Episode or Real-Time Project	Nominated	
2017	20th Annual D.I.C.E. Awards	Outstanding Achievement in Character (Nick Reyes)	Nominated	

== Legacy ==
Retrospective assessments of Call of Duty: Infinite Warfare have been mixed. Reviewers have generally praised the single-player campaign and Zombies modes, while criticizing the game's multiplayer. Several critics praised the campaign for its set-pieces, focus on a single character, and depth, with some arguing that the game offers one of the best Call of Duty campaigns ever. Writing in 2019, Gareth Damian Martin of PC Gamer praised the game for its science-fiction elements and world-building, concluding that "against all the odds, Infinite Warfare manages to not just be a serviceable science fiction game, but a great one after all."

The multiplayer was criticized for its combat, gunplay, and map designs; Dave Aubrey of Sports Illustrated believed the experience lacked focus and was not as "grounded" as previous entries. Cade Onder of ComicBook.com said that the multiplayer failed to distinguish itself enough from Advanced Warfare and Black Ops III beyond its space setting. In lists ranking the series' games, some have called Infinite Warfare one of the worst Call of Duty games, if not the worst, while others place it below the top 10.
