= Call of Duty 4: Modern Warfare =

2007 video game

- Developer: Infinity Ward (Note: The Mac OS X version was ported by Aspyr. The Wii version of the game was developed by Treyarch.)
- Publisher: Activision
- Director: Jason West
- Producer: Mark Rubin
- Designers: Todd Alderman; Steve Fukuda; Mackey McCandlish; Zied Rieke
- Programmers: Richard Baker; Robert Field; Francesco Gigliotti; Earl Hammon Jr
- Artists: Richard Kriegler; Chris Cherubini; Joel Emslie; Robert Gaines
- Writer: Jesse Stern
- Composer: Stephen Barton
- Series: Call of Duty
- Engine: IW 3.0
- Platforms: Microsoft Windows; PlayStation 3; Xbox 360; Mac OS X; Wii
- Release: November 5, 2007: Microsoft Windows, PlayStation 3, Xbox 360; NA: November 5, 2007; AU: November 7, 2007; EU: November 9, 2007 Mac OS X; NA: September 26, 2008; PAL: January 28, 2011 Wii; WW: November 10, 2009
- Genre: First-person shooter
- Modes: Single-player, multiplayer

Call of Duty 4: Modern Warfare is a 2007 first-person shooter game developed by Infinity Ward and published by Activision. It is the fourth main installment in the Call of Duty series. The game breaks away from the World War II setting of previous entries and is instead set in modern times. Developed over two years, Modern Warfare was released in November 2007 for the PlayStation 3, Xbox 360, and Microsoft Windows. A Wii port, developed by Treyarch and subtitled Reflex Edition, was released in 2009. It was followed by two sequels that continue the storyline: Modern Warfare 2 (2009) and Modern Warfare 3 (2011).

The game was critically acclaimed, especially for its gameplay and storyline, winning numerous "Game of the Year" titles. It was the top-selling game worldwide in 2007, selling around seven million copies by January 2008 and almost sixteen million by November 2013. Retrospective reviewers consider it one of the best, if not the best, games in the series, and one of the greatest video games ever made for its influential campaign and multiplayer. The multiplayer portion of the game features numerous game modes and contains a leveling system that allows the player to unlock additional weapons, weapon attachments, and camouflage schemes as they advance.

A remastered version of the game, developed by Raven Software and titled Call of Duty: Modern Warfare Remastered, was released as part of special edition bundles of Call of Duty: Infinite Warfare in November 2016 and as a standalone game in June 2017. A reboot of the Modern Warfare game, Call of Duty: Modern Warfare, was released in October 2019, which also spawned three sequels; Modern Warfare II (2022), Modern Warfare III (2023), and Modern Warfare 4 (2026).

== Gameplay ==
Call of Duty 4: Modern Warfare is a first-person shooter. The game uses a modern military arsenal, including flashbangs, night vision, and suppressed weapons. The player can stand, crouch, or go prone; movement and stance affect the weapon crosshair, with crouching and going prone improving accuracy. The game uses regenerating health: after the player takes damage, visual indicators warn them to seek cover, and health recovers if they avoid further enemy fire. The heads-up display shows information such as current objectives, ammunition, stance, nearby grenades, and the direction of incoming damage.

=== Campaign ===
The single-player campaign is played from multiple perspectives, including members of the British Special Air Service and the United States Marine Corps. Missions are objective-based; the HUD and compass direct the player toward goals such as reaching checkpoints, clearing enemy positions, defending locations, and planting explosives. Completing the campaign unlocks "Mile High Club", a standalone epilogue mission in which an SAS squad rescues a hostage from a hijacked aircraft. The campaign also contains 30 collectible pieces of enemy intel that unlock optional cheats and visual filters.

=== Multiplayer ===
A player captures a flag in the multiplayer mode "Domination".

Call of Duty 4: Modern Warfare includes free-for-all and team-based multiplayer modes on a set of maps, with objectives ranging from deathmatch to capturing control points or planting explosives. Players earn experience points for many match actions, including kills, capturing control points, and calling in support. Experience increases the player's rank and unlocks weapons, perks, custom-class options, and other multiplayer content.

The custom-class system lets players choose a primary weapon, sidearm, attachments, a special grenade, and three perks. Perks are organized into three groups and grant bonuses such as additional explosives, increased health, or abilities that activate on death. In console versions, reaching the level cap opens Prestige mode, which resets the player's rank and unlocks in exchange for a new insignia; this can be repeated up to ten times.

Multiplayer also includes killstreak rewards for defeating opponents without dying. A three-kill streak allows the player to call in a UAV reconnaissance scan, a five-kill streak an airstrike, and a seven-kill streak an attack helicopter.

== Plot ==
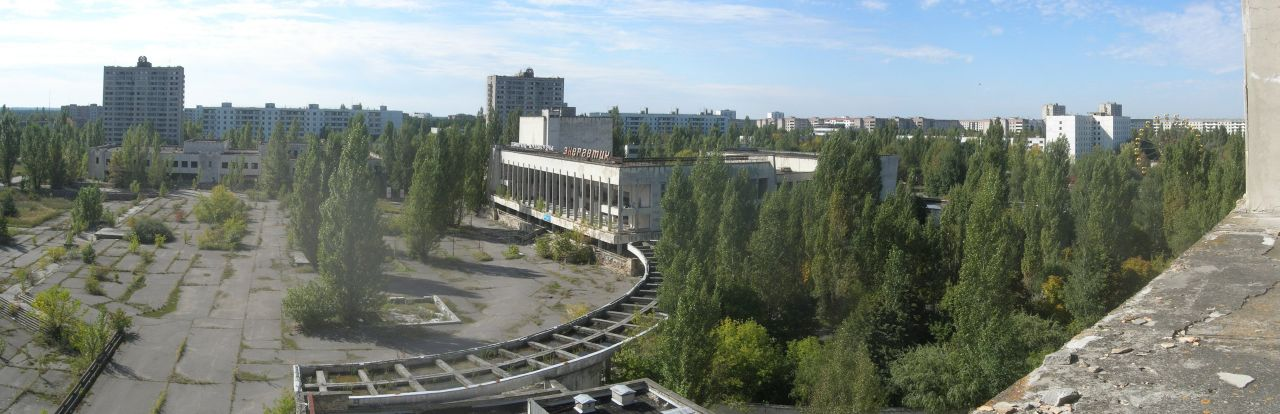
The mission "All Ghillied Up" is set in the abandoned city of Pripyat, Ukraine.

In 2011, civil war breaks out in Russia between the government and Ultranationalists who seek to restore the country's Soviet-era influence. At the same time, Khaled Al-Asad leads a coup in an unnamed Middle Eastern country and executes its president, Yasir Al-Fulani.

New SAS recruit Sergeant John "Soap" MacTavish joins a team commanded by Captain John Price and Gaz. The team raids a cargo ship in the Bering Strait and finds a nuclear device connected to Al-Asad before enemy aircraft sink the vessel. After escaping, the SAS rescues Nikolai, a Russian informant embedded with the Ultranationalists, with the aid of loyalist forces led by Sergeant Kamarov. Their helicopter is later shot down, but they survive with support from an AC-130 gunship.

The United States invades the Middle Eastern country to capture Al-Asad. Sergeant Paul Jackson, serving under Lieutenant Vasquez and Staff Sergeant Griggs, takes part in the assault, but U.S. forces fail to find Al-Asad. Intelligence indicates that a Russian nuclear device may be in the capital. As Marines attempt to withdraw from the city, the device detonates, killing Jackson, Vasquez, and much of the invasion force.

Price's team and the Russian loyalists track Al-Asad to a safe house in Azerbaijan. During the interrogation, Price answers Al-Asad's phone and recognizes the caller as Imran Zakhaev, the leader of the Russian Ultranationalists. Price executes Al-Asad and recounts his previous encounter with Zakhaev.

In 1996, after the Chernobyl disaster and the collapse of the Soviet Union, Zakhaev profits from nuclear proliferation and uses his wealth to build the Ultranationalist movement. Price, then a lieutenant, and Captain MacMillan are sent to assassinate him in Pripyat, Ukraine. Price shoots Zakhaev, severing his arm, but Zakhaev survives and Price and MacMillan escape.

In the present, Ultranationalist forces attack the safe house, but Price's team is rescued by Force Recon Marines led by Griggs. The SAS, Force Recon, and Russian loyalists form a joint task force to capture Zakhaev's son, Victor, hoping to learn Zakhaev's location. When cornered, Victor commits suicide. Zakhaev retaliates by seizing a nuclear launch facility in the Altai Mountains and launches intercontinental ballistic missiles toward the United States.

The task force retakes the facility and destroys the missiles over the Atlantic Ocean. During their escape, Zakhaev's forces destroy a bridge, trapping the survivors. Griggs is killed, and Zakhaev executes Gaz and other wounded soldiers. Then, Kamarov and his loyalist forces arrive and destroy Zakhaev's aircraft. Price then slides a pistol to Soap, who kills Zakhaev and his escorts. Kamarov and his forces land and evacuate Price, Soap, and the other survivors.

== Development ==
Call of Duty 4: Modern Warfare was developed by Infinity Ward over roughly two years by a team of about 100 people. After completing Call of Duty 2, the studio wanted to move away from the World War II setting of earlier entries. According to a postmortem by Infinity Ward designers Zied Rieke and Michael Boon, the team considered several directions before settling on a modern setting; the studio also began a separate prototype for a new intellectual property, but the parallel project competed with Call of Duty 4 for ideas and staff. In a later interview, Infinity Ward executives Vince Zampella and Jason West said Activision initially resisted the modern setting because it considered the move away from World War II risky.

The new setting affected the campaign's structure and storytelling. Studio head Grant Collier said the absence of Nazi antagonists required the team to make the game more story-driven and establish its villains through the missions themselves. He also said the modern setting allowed the campaign to move quickly between locations while keeping a recurring cast of characters. Infinity Ward avoided directly depicting then-current wars, instead creating a fictional contemporary conflict. To improve the game's sense of authenticity, the developers observed a live-fire exercise at Marine Corps Air Ground Combat Center Twentynine Palms and consulted U.S. Marines with recent combat experience. Veterans also advised the team during motion capture and artificial intelligence development.

=== Design and technology ===
Infinity Ward built the game on its proprietary IW engine. The engine supported features including dynamic lighting, depth of field, complex animation, sound, artificial intelligence, and dynamic bullet penetration. The studio prioritized a 60 frames-per-second target, which influenced tradeoffs such as limiting the extent of destructible environments. Bullet penetration allowed shots to pass through some surfaces, making the distinction between cover and concealment important during play.

For the multiplayer component, Infinity Ward aimed to make online play accessible to new players while still rewarding experienced ones. The team originally experimented with air-support rewards that required players to fight over special trigger zones, but replaced the idea with the killstreak system because the earlier design discouraged the intended flow of deathmatch play. The developers also let players choose weapons before matches to reduce weapon hunting, and designed maps primarily around deathmatch layouts that could also support other modes.

=== Audio ===
The game's original score was written primarily by British composer Stephen Barton, while Harry Gregson-Williams wrote the main theme and oversaw much of the music. The score combined orchestral music with electronic elements, modern percussion, and ethnic instruments, with orchestral recording done in London at Abbey Road Studios. The rap song played during the end credits was performed by Infinity Ward lead animator Mark Grigsby.

== Marketing and release ==
Infinity Ward used the promotional website CharlieOscarDelta.com to market Call of Duty 4: Modern Warfare before release. A high-definition trailer was distributed through the site in April 2007 and later made available through Xbox Live Marketplace. An Xbox 360 multiplayer beta was held before release, and a Windows single-player demo containing the mission "The Bog" was released in October 2007.

Call of Duty 4: Modern Warfare was released for Microsoft Windows, PlayStation 3, and Xbox 360 in North America on November 5, 2007, in Australia on November 7, and in Europe on November 9. Activision also released a Limited Collector's Edition for Xbox 360 and Windows. The Xbox 360 version included a hardcover art book and a bonus DVD about the SAS and the game's development, while the Windows version included a digital copy of the official strategy guide. A Mac OS X version, ported by Aspyr, was released in 2008. A Wii port, Call of Duty: Modern Warfare – Reflex Edition, was developed by Treyarch and released on November 10, 2009, alongside Call of Duty: Modern Warfare 2.

=== Downloadable content ===
The Variety Map Pack, developed by Infinity Ward, was released first for Xbox 360 as part of a timed-exclusivity arrangement between Microsoft and Activision for Call of Duty map packs. It added four multiplayer maps: "Broadcast", "Chinatown", "Creek", and "Killhouse". Activision said the pack surpassed one million paid downloads on Xbox Live Marketplace in its first nine days, setting a record for paid Xbox Live downloadable content; the company also announced that the pack would be released for PlayStation 3 on April 24, 2008. The Windows version was released as a free download in June 2008 through a sponsorship with Nvidia.

== Reception ==
Reception

Aggregate score
| Aggregator | Score |
|---|---|
| Metacritic | (PC) 92/100 (PS3) 94/100 (Wii) 76/100 (X360) 94/100 |

Review scores
| Publication | Score |
|---|---|
| Eurogamer | 9/10 |
| Game Informer | 10/10 |
| GamePro | 5/5 |
| GameSpot | 9/10 |
| GameSpy | 5/5 |
| IGN | 9.4/10 |
| Official Xbox Magazine (US) | 10/10 |
| X-Play | 5/5 |

=== Critical response ===
Call of Duty 4: Modern Warfare received "universal acclaim" for its Xbox 360, PlayStation 3, and PC versions, and "generally favorable reviews" for its Wii version, according to review aggregator Metacritic. Critics praised the game's move from World War II to a contemporary military setting, its set-piece-driven campaign, production values, and multiplayer mode. GameSpot's Jeff Gerstmann described the campaign as brief, but said its quality and the multiplayer made the game a strong overall package. IGN similarly praised the campaign's scripted sequences and multiplayer depth, while noting that the campaign remained linear. GamesRadar+ called the game finely crafted, but said it was not a major departure from earlier Call of Duty games.

Reviewers commonly singled out the multiplayer as one of the game's strongest elements. GamePro compared its depth and reach to Halo 3, while X-Play said the game came close to perfecting the shooter formula rather than reinventing it. Criticism focused mainly on the short length and linear structure of the single-player campaign.

=== Wii version ===
The Wii port, Call of Duty: Modern Warfare – Reflex Edition, received a lower but generally positive critical response. Reviewers said it preserved much of the original campaign and multiplayer, but criticized visual compromises and control issues. GameSpot gave the port 8.5/10, praising its campaign and online multiplayer while noting occasional aiming problems and weaker visuals. IGN gave it 7.0/10, saying that its customization options and multiplayer were strong but that its visuals and pointer controls were less polished than Call of Duty: World at War on Wii.

=== Sales ===
In the United States, the Xbox 360 version of Call of Duty 4: Modern Warfare was the best-selling software SKU of November 2007, selling 1.57 million copies, while the PlayStation 3 version sold 444,000 copies that month. Activision said in January 2008 that, based on data from The NPD Group, Chart-Track, and GfK, the game was the best-selling title worldwide by units for 2007 and had sold more than seven million copies since launch. In June 2008, Infinity Ward said the game had sold more than 10 million copies. By May 2009, Activision said sales had passed 13 million copies. By November 2013, the game had sold 15.7 million copies.

=== Accolades ===
Call of Duty 4: Modern Warfare received several year-end awards. At the 11th Annual Interactive Achievement Awards, the Academy of Interactive Arts & Sciences honored the game with Overall Game of the Year, Console Game of the Year, Action Game of the Year, and Outstanding Achievement in Online Gameplay. At the 5th British Academy Video Games Awards, it won Gameplay, Story and Character, and the publicly voted GAME Award of 2008. It also won Best Action Game at the Game Critics Awards and Ultimate Game of the Year at the 2008 Golden Joystick Awards.

== Legacy ==
=== Sequels and reboot ===
Modern Warfare spawned two sequels: Modern Warfare 2 and Modern Warfare 3, which were released in 2009 and 2011, respectively. A reboot of all three Modern Warfare installments, developed by Infinity Ward and simply titled Call of Duty: Modern Warfare, was released in October 2019.

=== Remaster ===
A remastered version of Modern Warfare, titled Call of Duty: Modern Warfare Remastered, was developed by Raven Software. The remaster was first released as part of several special editions of Call of Duty: Infinite Warfare when that game was released for Microsoft Windows, PlayStation 4 and Xbox One, followed by a standalone release for PlayStation 4 in June 2017, and for Microsoft Windows and Xbox One in July 2017. The game retains the original's singer-player campaign and an updated version of its multiplayer mode that shares similarities with those featured in later Call of Duty games. New content in the multiplayer can be unlocked through completing challenges, crafting, or buying in-game currency through microtransactions. Remastered features enhanced textures and lighting, new models, changes to the heads-up display, and remastered audio. The game offers full PlayStation Network trophy and Xbox Live achievement support—trophies were absent from Modern Warfare because the game was released before they were introduced—by including several new challenges.

=== Retrospective acclaim ===
Retrospective assessments rank Call of Duty 4: Modern Warfare as one of the best games in the franchise, if not the best. Critics have described the game as a classic, one that changed gaming, and one of the greatest video games ever made. Modern Warfare has received critical acclaim for its campaign, characters, missions (particularly "All Ghillied Up"), and successfully breaking away from the series' World War II roots. ComicBook.com's Cade Onder argued Modern Warfare includes "some of the most jawdropping moments in gaming [...] It's a game that just builds constant momentum and leaves you on the edge of your seat start to finish, making it an all-time classic." Dan Wenerowicz of Complex said the game represented the start of the "Golden Age" of Call of Duty.

Modern Warfare's multiplayer is considered revolutionary, introducing numerous conventions that become hallmarks of subsequent Call of Duty games and other first-person shooters, including XP leveling, the "Prestige" system (allowing players to restart from rank one), the create-a-class system, perks, killstreaks, and camo grinds. Digital Trends summarized: "Modern Warfare's competitive multiplayer put a renewed emphasis on personal performance rather than winning individual matches, with players now carefully eyeing their kill-to-death ratio as they modified their weapons with custom sights and grips. Call of Duty would no longer play second fiddle to any other series, and its reign would last for the next decade." Other reviewers argued that subsequent games in the series improved upon the conventions set by Modern Warfare.

== See also ==
- Call of Duty 3 – previous installment in the series
- Call of Duty: World at War – fifth and next installment in the series
