= Taehoon Oh =

South Korean game designer and artist

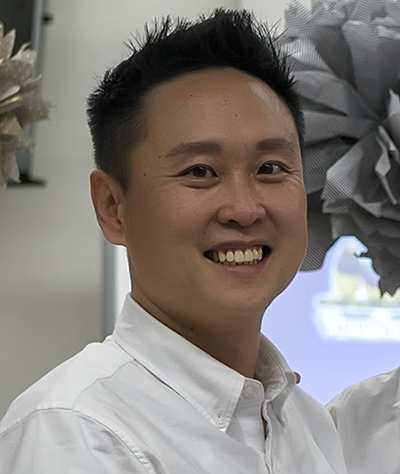
- Born: 오태훈; Seoul, South Korea
- Title: Game Designer, COO at Studio Roqovan

Taehoon Oh is a computer graphic specialist, game designer and developer. He is a co-founder and COO at Studio Roqovan, formerly known as Reload Studios. He was a lead artist and was one of the pioneer developers of the Call of Duty game franchise. He is also one of the co-founders of the non-gaming virtual reality subdivision of Studio Roqovan called Rascali, launched in September 2015.

== Career ==
Oh is the owner of Stunt Corgi & serves as chief operating officer at Reload Studios, which he founded in 2014 with James Chung and later renamed as Studio Roqovan. There, in 2016, he developed a new game, World War Toons, a first-person multiplayer shooter game compatible with 3D VR (Virtual Reality) and PSVR.

While working for Infinity Ward (the original COD developers) from 2004 to 2014, Taehoon as a senior and lead artist designed over 50 vehicles and 100 weapons used in Call of Duty's different versions including Call of Duty 2, Call of Duty 4: Modern Warfare, Call of Duty: Modern Warfare 2, Call of Duty: Modern Warfare 3, and Call of Duty: Ghosts.

In 2007, he won the global game art competition for the game Dominance War, and he served as a judge in various gaming competitions.

== Early life ==
Oh's early education took place in South Korea. His gaming interest was developed when his father bought him an Apple II personal computer.

== Awards ==
World Champion of global games art competition held in 2007 for the game Dominance war.
