= Call of Duty: Experience 2016 =

2nd Call of Duty gaming convention

- Genre: Video gaming
- Locations: The Forum; Inglewood, California
- Country: United States
- Organizer: Activision Infinity Ward
- Website: Call of Duty: XP

Call of Duty: Experience 2016 (shortened to Call of Duty: XP 2016 and CoD: XP 2016) was the second Call of Duty gaming convention held by Activision and Infinity Ward. It took place at The Forum in Inglewood, California from September 2 to September 4, 2016. Serving as the follow-up to the first convention held in 2011, the event featured the multiplayer reveal for the upcoming title Call of Duty: Infinite Warfare as well as the 2016 Call of Duty World League Championship.

== Background ==
The first Call of Duty XP event was held in 2011 to promote Call of Duty: Modern Warfare 3 and its multiplayer mode as well as the series' online service Call of Duty: Elite. Also at the event was a $1,000,000 tournament featuring competitive Call of Duty teams. For the 2016 event, select people within the Call of Duty community who had covered the game multiple times received a surprise envelope from Activision, the publisher of Call of Duty, in early June 2016. These envelopes were not to be open until the day after it was received. Once opened, a ticket to the Call of Duty XP 2016 event was revealed as the envelope's contents.

== Location and setup ==
Call of Duty XP 2016 took place at The Forum, an arena in Inglewood, California. The convention was held from September 2 to September 4, 2016. It had three ticket packages; Enlisted ($49), Veteran ($129), and Prestige ($199), with each package tier offering more content (i.e. only the Veteran and Prestige tiers have the Care Package bonus and only the Prestige tier has the VIP Lounge access bonus). Each tier, however, features bonus digital content for both Call of Duty: Black Ops III and Call of Duty: Infinite Warfare.

== Events ==
=== Infinite Warfare multiplayer and Black Ops III DLC ===
One of the prominent events of Call of Duty XP 2016 was the official reveal of the Call of Duty: Infinite Warfare multiplayer mode. Anyone who attended the convention was able to play the multiplayer mode hands-on, being the first people of the public to do so. Also playable was the game's Zombies mode as well as the multiplayer mode for Call of Duty: Modern Warfare Remastered. The fourth map pack for Call of Duty: Black Ops III, Salvation, was also playable at the convention.

=== 2016 Call of Duty World League Championship ===
Another prominent event of the convention was the 2016 Call of Duty World League Championship, a competitive e-sports tournament. The tournament, which is similar to the one held at the first Call of Duty XP convention, featured 32 competitive Call of Duty teams from around the world. The prize pool was $2,000,000, which became the largest prize pool in Call of Duty Championship history and double the pool at the first event. Team EnVyUs won the championship, defeating Splyce Gaming in the finals 3-1.

=== Other events and announcements ===
Present at the convention were two activities that were spin-offs from in-game experiences. One was Nuketown Paintball, which is paintball in a course that replicates the famous Nuketown map as seen in the Call of Duty: Black Ops titles. The other activity was Zombies laser tag, which was essentially laser tag in a course that replicates the Zombies mode and universe, which has been present in Black Ops titles. An experimental and exclusive Call of Duty-related PlayStation VR experience was also shown and tested at the convention. One special announcement at the convention was the detailing of the maps in Modern Warfare Remastered. Originally, only ten maps from the original game were to remastered, but at the convention, Activision revealed that the six maps there were to be left out would be added in during an update in December 2016. Rappers Snoop Dogg and Wiz Khalifa were special music guests at the convention. Celtic punk band Dropkick Murphys and rapper Kanye West appeared as musical guests during the first Call of Duty XP convention.
