= Find Makarov: Operation Kingfish =

2011 short film

- Title logo
- Directed by: Jeff Chan
- Screenplay by: Patrick Lo; Peter Huang; Chris Pare
- Produced by: Evan Stasyshyn; David Fradkin
- Starring: Jon Morgan; David Kinsman; David Brandon George
- Edited by: Skinner
- Music by: Adam Damelin
- Distributed by: Activision
- Release date: September 2, 2011 (Call of Duty XP)
- Running time: 6 minutes

Find Makarov: Operation Kingfish is a 2011 short film and a prequel to Call of Duty: Modern Warfare 2, first shown at Call of Duty XP convention. The video was produced by We Can Pretend, with visual effects by The Junction, and was endorsed by Activision.

The first film, Find Makarov, was a non-canonical fan-made film. The video was well received by fans as well as Activision themselves. Activision contacted We Can Pretend about the video and helped produce Find Makarov: Operation Kingfish.

The video follows closely with the antagonist General Shepherd's speech in the mission "Endgame". It shows the protagonists, Task Force 141 and Delta Force, participating in an assault on a Ukrainian compound, with the objective of finding an unidentified "High-Value Target" code-named Kingfish, who is later revealed to be Vladimir Makarov. It also shows the team leaving Captain Price behind, leading to his future incarceration in a Siberian gulag.

== Plot ==
John "Soap" MacTavish is sitting at a table, loading a STANAG magazine; General Shepherd visits him, asking Soap what happened during his mission when he lost his superior officer, Captain Price.

In 2013, in the Karkonosze Mountains, Ukraine, a joint operation between Task Force 141 and the U.S. Delta Force leads an assault on a safe house owned by their target, "Kingfish". Captain Price, Soap, Ghost, Roach, and other Task Force 141 operatives raid the compound while Delta Force operatives Sandman and Frost provide sniper support with the help of a friendly AC-130, callsign Spectre 6-4.

After Spectre clears the way for the Task Force, Soap's team advances into the safehouse and kills all the remaining hostiles. Roach plants a breaching charge on a wall, with Ghost entering the room first and killing the soldiers inside. The team enters the room after clearing it of the enemy, where there are pictures of an Zakhaev International Airport and a Bravo Six team that had been sent in earlier.

Soap and Price discover that the picture of Bravo Six has their faces on it, realizing that "Kingfish" is targeting them before a C4 detonator beeps to destroy the room; however, they escape before the blast can kill them.

The mission was compromised, and the squad and Delta Force head to their extraction point pursued by enemy forces. While Spectre 6-4 provides covering fire for their escape, an enemy RPG fire destroys Spectre 6-4, leaving the Task Force to fend for themselves. A V-22 Osprey arrives for exfil, but an RPG explodes near Soap, knocking him down. Sandman and Roach drag Soap to the Osprey while Frost and Price rush to cover them. Price then orders the rest of the team to leave without him while he provides covering fire; Soap, however, refuses to leave him behind. Overlord orders the Osprey pilot to take off immediately. Price is then shot, but he continues to cover fire for the team to escape before he is overwhelmed by the enemy soldiers.

Back at the present, Soap demands that Shepherd tell him Kingfish's true identity, Shepherd throws him a dossier with a picture of Vladimir Makarov, declaring "We'll get him." Soap then draws his combat knife and stabs the picture of Makarov.

== Cast ==
- Jon Morgan as Captain John "Soap" MacTavish
- David Kinsman as Captain John Price
- David Brandon George as Lt. Gen. Shepherd
- Keeghan Wilson as Lt. Simon "Ghost" Riley
- Ray Davids as MSgt. "Sandman"
- Dennis Allcock as Sgt. Gary "Roach" Sanderson
- Justin Major as SSgt. Derek "Frost" Westbrook

== Production and release ==
The site was discovered after the website received bloody dog tags in the mail, with one supposedly being those of General Shepherd and the containing the URL address and the message, "End the war" above.

Upon discovery of the website, a timer was ticking down until the March 2nd, 2011, a date which would coincide with the Game Developers Conference. Due to the viral nature of the website, the date's significance, the site's IP being registered in Los Angeles, and a similar marketing approach for Call of Duty: Black Ops, many believed the timer to show the date for a possible Call of Duty: Modern Warfare 3 reveal trailer, causing the site to gain large amounts of traffic.

However, on February 26, Activision, publishers of the Call of Duty series, denied that they were linked to it in any way and declared it to be a hoax. This was proven to be true; on March 2, 2011, a video entitled "Find Makarov" was uploaded onto YouTube, with the findmakarov.com website having the video embedded on the page. The official video currently has over 8,700,000 views.

The original short started out as a personal project for staff Jeff Chan. "I was playing through Modern Warfare 2," he says, "and I'm a filmmaker and I really liked the game. I was like I've never really seen a film from a first person perspective. I was like, what if you made a film from a first-person perspective, and it wasn't as crappy as Doom?" He came up with a story and a script, and took it to his co-workers at We Can Pretend, a digital media agency in Toronto. They all happened to be Call of Duty fans as well, and agreed to work on the movie together. "We all decided to kind of make this project," says Chan. "We were like screw it, we'll invest into it, and we'll see what happens".

After the first film did so well, the filmmakers had an idea for a second project based on the Call of Duty series, and We Can Pretend called up Activision to propose it. "The first thing they said," says Fradkin, "is the script that we sent them, the original script, was way too close to the game. We can't do it, we're stepping on their toes. Then we kind of started about, 'Ok, these are the elements we can use, these are the elements we can't,' talking about it and making the script that you saw".
