= Nadeshot =

American content creator and former professional esports player

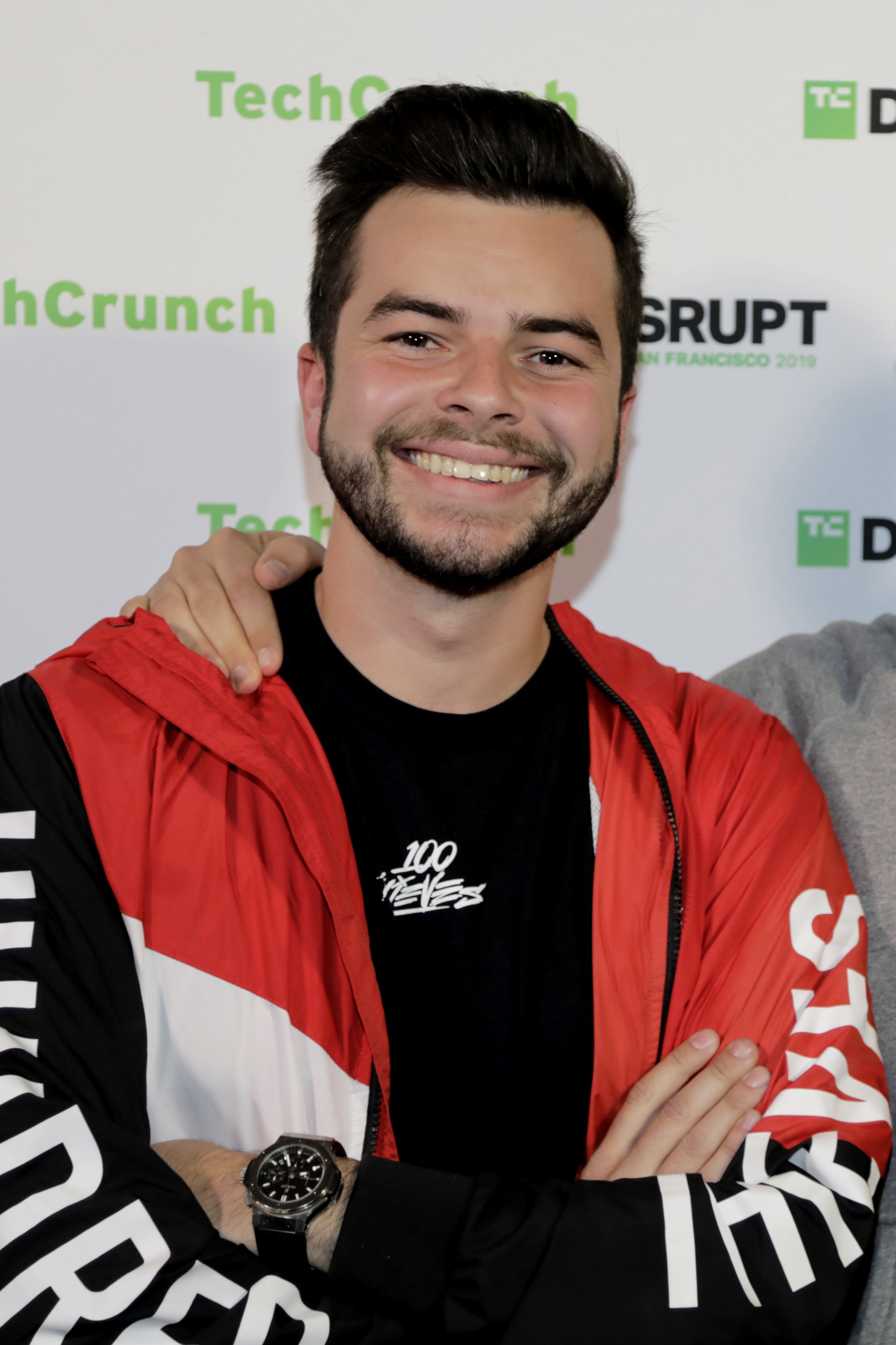
- Haag in 2019
- Born: Matthew Haag; August 3, 1992 (age 34)
- Education: Amos Alonzo Stagg High School
- Title: Founder and co-owner of 100 Thieves
- Spouse: Haley Hey (m. 2023)
- Children: 2

Esports career information
- Games: Call of Duty
- Playing career: 2008–2015

Team history
- 2009–2010: Genesis
- 2010–2015: OpTic Gaming

Matthew Haag (born August 3, 1992), better known as Nadeshot (formerly stylized as NaDeSHoT), is an American content creator, businessman, and former professional Call of Duty player. He is the founder, co-owner and former CEO of 100 Thieves. As a professional Call of Duty player, Haag was a former captain of OpTic Gaming in the 2014 Call of Duty: Ghosts season and the 2014–2015 Call of Duty: Advanced Warfare season, playing the objective support role.

Haag is a Major League Gaming (MLG) X Games 2014 gold medalist and 2011 Call of Duty XP World Champion, winning Best eSports player at The Game Awards 2014. He is a former Red Bull esports athlete and participates in the Twitch streaming program. Haag was previously sponsored by several gaming hardware companies, including Astro Gaming and Scuf Gaming. He also runs a YouTube channel with over 3.2 million subscribers and over 270 hours of content.

== Early life ==
Haag was born on August 3, 1992, to Jeff and Christina Haag. He has a brother Kevin and sister Sarah.

Haag attended Amos Alonzo Stagg High School in Palos Hills, Illinois, and graduated in 2010. He has also completed a two-year course in business studies at Moraine Valley Community College. Prior to competing in competitive gaming, Haag worked at a McDonald's restaurant.

== Playing career ==
=== Early career ===
Haag's gaming handle, "NaDeSHoT" originates from "grenade shot", a lethal move in the Halo series in which a grenade is followed by a gunshot. Haag was a competitive amateur in the first-person shooter Halo 2, but switched to the third-person tactical shooter series, Gears of War after getting the game as a Christmas present. He narrowly missed qualifying for MLG Chicago in Gears of War play by one slot in 2007. He competed in his first professional online tournament in 2008 and at the age of 16 he made his professional debut on Call of Duty 4: Modern Warfare.

=== OpTic career ===
Haag became a member of OpTic Gaming in June 2010, when he first joined the OpTic competitive team. In 2014, he became the captain of OpTic Gaming after Will "BigTymer" Johnson resigned. Haag stepped down as OpTic Gaming's captain after a seventh-place finish at the 2015 Call of Duty Championship tournament. Nadeshot then decided to leave OpTic in 2016.

=== Call of Duty: Black Ops 2010–11 season ===
Haag was dropped from the team for the Call of Duty: Black Ops 2011 season which was the first season of Call of Duty on the Major League Gaming circuit since Call of Duty 4: Modern Warfare. He briefly returned to the OpTic Competitive team, replacing a player who felt ill, at MLG Dallas where OpTic Gaming finished 3rd with virtually no practice as a squad. Subsequently, after mentioning the possibility of replacing the teammate that had fallen sick he did not get picked up. Haag played on several different teams in the professional scene and created his own OpTic Nation competitive team and started making videos and streaming footage. For the next two events he played for Team EnVyUs finishing 8th at MLG Anaheim and then 3rd at MLG Raleigh before playing on Surreal Legacy for the final two events of the year placing 7th at MLG Orlando and then finishing 15th at the MLG Providence national championships to finish off the Call of Duty: Black Ops Major League Gaming season.

=== Call of Duty: Modern Warfare 3 2011–12 season ===
With Call of Duty: Modern Warfare 3 looming, Call of Duty announced Call of Duty XP where Activision hosted a $1 million tournament to showcase the newest edition of the franchise. With 2 members of the OpTic Gaming team not being available to play, Haag was picked up again. They made it to the Grand Final. They took the series 3-1 and Haag pocketed $100,000 with his team winning $400,000 and the trophy.

=== Call of Duty: Black Ops II 2012–13 season ===
Treyarch were to make Call of Duty: Black Ops II which was the third game in the Black Ops franchise. The game was a success competitively and attracted a bigger audience through the season. With Frag Cup 4, an annual online tournament at the start of a new Call of Duty title, coming up a member of the OpTic Gaming competitive team was unable to play due to gambling restrictions in his province, and after impressing early on in the game, OpTic Gaming picked up Haag, who rejoined the OpTic Gaming competitive team on a permanent basis. They finished in the 7th/8th position in Frag Cup 4 before going to the first LAN event which was UMG Chicago. OpTic Gaming started the tournament strong, making their way to the finals without losing. The team then lost the first series in the final. However, because they were the winners of the 'winners final' the match went into a final and decisive series, in which they were able to win 3-2 and become the first Call of Duty: Black Ops II champions.

The next tournament was MLG Dallas. Here, the top 8 teams qualified to compete at that year's Call of Duty Championships, which was an annual $1,000,000 event. Haag and OpTic Gaming went on to finish in the 5th/6th position.

At the Call of Duty Championships, OpTic Gaming finished in third place losing to the eventual winners of the tournament. They then played in Gfinity 1 (G1) in London, United Kingdom and MLG Anaheim in Anaheim, California where were placed in third respectively at both events. The next event Haag attended was Gfinity (G2) in London. However, their new roster finished 9th–12th. Their performance at the MLG Fullsail Invitational, where the four highest ranked Black Ops II teams competed, (and which was to be OpTic Gaming and MLG's final event of the Call of Duty: Black Ops II competitive season) was much improved, finishing in second place behind Complexity Gaming.

=== Call of Duty: Ghosts 2013–14 season ===
The next title of the Call of Duty franchise was Call of Duty: Ghosts which MLG announced that it would be their featured FPS title for the upcoming season again. Haag and OpTic Gaming disappointed at both of their first two events which were to be MLG Columbus (13–16th place) and UMG Philadelphia (9–12th place) before a roster change occurred with one player retiring, two leaving and one later rejoining. During this time Haag teamed with Christopher Duarte, who goes by the name of 'Parasite'. At this time, the team consisted of 'NaDeSHoT', 'Clayster', 'Ricky' and 'Parasite'. However, after only a handful of days, 'Parasite' and 'Ricky' left OpTic to join Curse Las Vegas. OpTic then picked up 'Saints' and 'MBoZe', before 'Scumpii' rejoined OpTic to replace the departing 'Saints', who returned to Strictly Business. After the retirement of 'BigTymer' following UMG Philadelphia, Haag became the captain of OpTic Gaming.

Optic, led by Haag, qualified for the Call of Duty: Ghosts national qualifiers for the annual Call of Duty Championship $1,000,000 tournaments after qualifying via MLG's online qualifying tournament. At the US Championship Finals OpTic Gaming finished in 7th place to qualify for the Call of Duty World Championship, after eliminating Curse New York in an elimination game in a best of 5 series. This allowed the team to qualify for the annual $1 million tournament. Haag and his OpTic Gaming squad played in the MLG Pro Circuit Season 1 online league where after a promising start they suffered problems online and were not able to qualify for the MLG PAX East Championship; eventually OpTic Gaming finished bottom of the league in 10th place. OpTic Gaming later announced that Haag and his teammates would be hosting the winners of the US Regional finals, Strictly Business Gaming for a pre-LAN event for the World Championships.

At the Call of Duty World Championships, OpTic were placed in a group with 'Epsilon eSports', 'NSP' and 'SSOF'; controversy was caused when 'SSOF' were disqualified and OpTic only had two teams in their group. OpTic first played 'NSP' and beat them 3-0 leading to a group decider against Epsilon where Haag and his team lost 3–0. However they advanced as the second seed and faced tK in the first round of the winners bracket. Haag led his team to a 3–0 victory against a team considered to be a top three team by many. In the second round Haag was to come up against Strictly Business Gaming who they had hosted in a pre-LAN event, however Haag and his teammates won 3–2 and played Australian team Trident T1 Dotters for a guaranteed top three finish. OpTic Gaming led by Haag won the series 3–1 and guaranteed themselves 3rd and $120,000. OpTic were then to face CompLexity who were undefeated on Call of Duty: Ghosts and came up short in the winners bracket finals losing 3–2. OpTic then lost to Team EnVyUs in the losers bracket finals and Haag led his team to a top three finish and won his cut of $30,000.

Shortly after the Call of Duty World Championships, Haag signed an exclusivity contract with MLG to stream himself playing Call of Duty on MLG's MLG.tv web streaming service. On April 15, 2014, OpTic Gaming announced that Marcus 'MBoZe' Blanks would be leaving the team in order for Jordan 'ProoFy' Cannon to join the team. The OpTic Gaming roster (Haag's teammates) for UGC Niagara and for the 2014 season Call of Duty:Ghosts season was Seth 'Scumpii' Abner, James 'Clayster' Eubanks and Jordan 'ProoFy' Cannon.

At the new roster's first tournament together, a lackluster first day lead to them having to play the world's best team, and eventual winners of UGC Niagara, CompLexity Gaming, who proved too strong for Haag's team. They narrowly won every map to take a 3–0 series win and knock Haag and his OpTic Gaming team out of the tournament. Before and after UGC Niagara Haag competed with his team in the MLG Pro Circuit Season 2 in order to qualify for MLG Anaheim's pro team tournament to contest for a $70,000 prize pool. Haag's team qualified, being second place in the league.

Haag and his OpTic Gaming team were invited to the MLG X Games on the Xbox One after finishing in the top 3 at the Call of Duty World Championships. They went into the event as underdogs after a disappointing tournament at UGC Niagara, however Haag and his team were able to win their group after beating Team EnVyUs and FaZe Red 3–1 to set up a semi final match against Evil Geniuses,(formerly known as CompLexity). Evil Geniuses were favorites to win the event after a dominant year at LAN events, but Haag and his three teammates were able to beat them 3–1 to face Team Kaliber in the Grand Finals. They managed to beat Team Kaliber in a match that came down to a Game 5, Round 10 in Search & Destroy, and Haag was able to win a gold medal and his first MLG Championship at the X Games in Austin, Texas.

Haag was voted by fans as The Game Awards 2014 eSports Player of the Year. He took a trip out to Las Vegas with some of his teammates and sponsors to accept this award.

=== Call of Duty: Advanced Warfare 2014–15 season ===
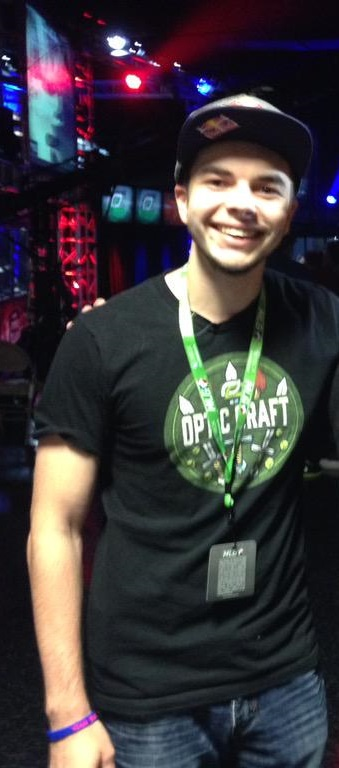
Haag at the MLG Call of Duty: Advanced Warfare Season 1 Championships at Columbus, Ohio in 2015

Advanced Warfare will be the next installment in the Call Of Duty Franchise for the e-sports circuit. The season formally began November 2014. Haag was invited by Activision to Los Angeles for a preview of Call of Duty: Advanced Warfare in order to advise developers on the state of the game. On October 28, 2014, OpTic Gaming, led by Haag, participated in an exclusive Call of Duty: Advanced Warfare streaming event at the so-called 'OpTic House' in Chicago, in order to promote the new edition in the franchise for its creators, Sledgehammer Games.

In season opening competition, MLG Columbus, Haag and his team achieved second place, losing out to FaZe in the Grand Final. This was a sad loss for OpTic and Haag, as they hadn't dropped a map all day until the grand finals. OpTic looked like they were going to win it all until they ran into Faze Clan in the finals. Faze narrowly took the victory, going all the way to a second best of five series.

The second tournament Haag competed in with OpTic was at UMG Orlando. Haag and his team achieved first place this time around. They went 0–2 in the first day of competition but his team managed to bounce back and with their other two games in pool play on the second day of competition. On Championship Sunday OpTic were crowned victorious as they beat a young team known as Stunner Gaming 3–1 in the grand finals.

Twelve teams qualified, including Haag's team, for Pro League Season 1: Prophecy, FaZe, Justus, Aware, Automatic Reload, EnVyUs, Denial, eLevate, Rise Nation, Team KaLiBeR, OpTic Nation, and OpTic Gaming. Haag's team now consists of Ian "Crimsix" Porter, Seth "Scumpii" Abner, and Matthew "Formal" Piper. OpTic Gaming were to go 38–6 in the MLG Season 1 Call of Duty: Advanced Warfare and qualified with the number one seed for the playoffs which they completed at with a $75,000 prize pool. OpTic Gaming went into the event led by NaDeSHoT and hoped to become the first team to win a LAN tournament without dropping a map. They went on to beat Rise Nation 3–0, they then came up against a team with young players called Aware Gaming who they beat 3–1 however this meant they did not become the first team to win an event without dropping a map. They then faced Team Kaliber in the winners bracket final who they narrowly beat 3–2 before progressing to the grand finals where they beat Denial eSports 3–0 to win their second event in a row. This was Haag's second win of an MLG event after winning previously at X Games during the Call of Duty: Ghosts season.

On April 4, 2015, NaDeSHoT announced that he was stepping down as captain and member of the OpTic Gaming pro-team. He said that he will become a full-time content creator as well as co-owner of the OpTic organization. He was replaced on the lineup by Damon "Karma" Barlow.

== 100 Thieves ==
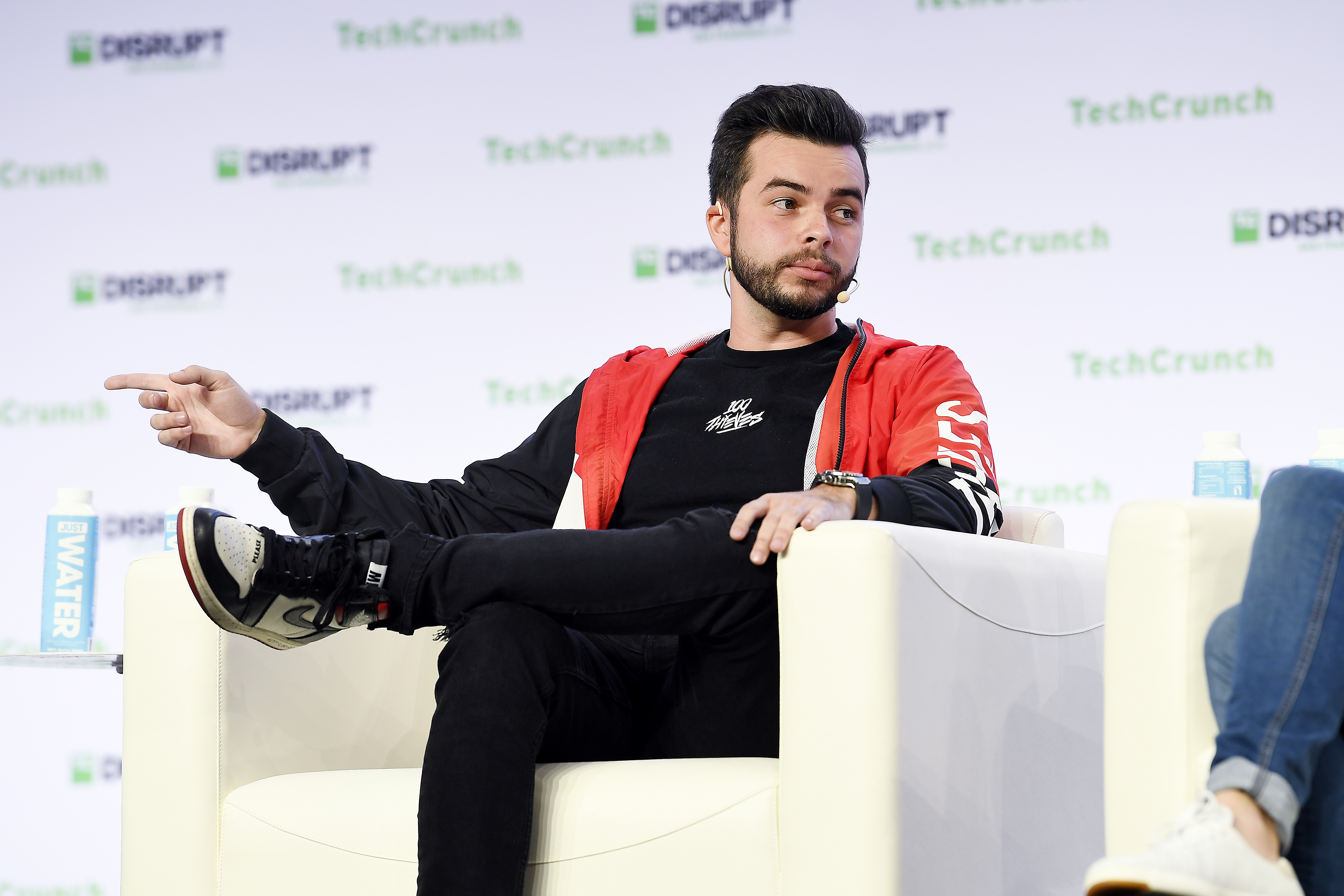
Haag at the TechCrunch Disrupt in 2019

In 2016, Haag founded a lifestyle brand and gaming organization based in Los Angeles, California called 100 Thieves. The organization has teams competing in Apex Legends, Call of Duty, Counter-Strike 2, Rainbow Six Siege, Marvel Rivals, and Valorant. 100 Thieves operates franchises in the Valorant Americas League, Apex Legends Global Series (branded as the Crazy Thieves), and Call of Duty League (branded as the Los Angeles Thieves). The company was co-founded alongside Cleveland Cavaliers owner Dan Gilbert. Drake bought ownership stake in 100 Thieves in 2018.

In December 2024, Haag revealed that he would be taking a step back from 100 Thieves to pursue full-time content creation.

In September 2025, Haag confirmed that he is no longer the CEO of 100 Thieves and had stepped down from the position sometime between 2023 and 2024, but remains involved with the organization in other roles.

== Personal life ==
On July 21, 2023, Haag married his long-time girlfriend Haley Hey. The Haags' first child, a daughter, was born in December 2023.

He is an avid golfer and has done several hole-in-one challenges. He participated in the inaugural Internet Invitational.

== Books ==
- Rodriguez, Hector; Haag, Matthew; Abner, Seth; Johnson, Will; Glassel, Ashley; Musselman, Ryan; Wyatt, Ryan (May 17, 2016). OpTic Gaming: The Making of eSports Champions. HarperCollins. ISBN 9780062449306.
