= Call of Duty: Experience 2011 =

Video game convention

Coordinates: 33°58′22″N 118°25′36″W

- Genre: Video gaming
- Locations: Playa Vista, Los Angeles, California
- Country: United States
- Inaugurated: 2011
- Attendance: About 6,000
- Organizer: Activision
- Website: Call of Duty: XP

Call of Duty: XP 2011 was the first annual convention hosted by Activision to celebrate their video game series Call of Duty. The convention was held in Los Angeles, California from September 2–3, 2011 in and around a 12-acre hangar where developer Infinity Ward (coupled with Sledgehammer Games) showcased their upcoming game, Call of Duty: Modern Warfare 3 and online service Call of Duty: Elite. The convention offered fans an opportunity to observe and participate in various events and attractions such as a $1 million tournament, live performances from various artists, Call of Duty: Modern Warfare 3 multiplayer, paintball, jeep off-roading, zip-lining, and a full-scale replica of Burger Town from Call of Duty: Modern Warfare 2.

A second Call of Duty: XP event was held from September 2 to September 4, 2016 at The Forum in Inglewood, California to promote the upcoming Infinite Warfare and Modern Warfare Remastered titles.

== General info ==
=== Location and setup ===
Call of Duty: XP 2011 was held in Los Angeles from September 2–3, 2011. It was hosted in and around a 12-acre hangar, once owned by Howard Hughes, at 5600 Campus Center Drive, Playa Vista, California. The hangar was outfitted with flat screen TVs and monitors, speakers, projectors, and (being sponsored by Xbox) Xbox 360s. It was also adorned with Call of Duty props and replicas from the franchise. Outside the hangar, several fan attractions were set up. One of the activities was the paintball course that was modeled after the multiplayer level "Scrapyard" from Call of Duty: Modern Warfare 2. Jeep sponsored the event by adding the "Jeep Ops Experience" in which attendees rode in Jeeps that navigated through an obstacle course. Activision erected a replica of Burger Town from Call of Duty: Modern Warfare 2. There they served guests an array of fast food. It also included a life-size replica of Call of Duty: Modern Warfare 2's MOUT, "The Pit", where fans could try running through the training course. Other attractions included a zip-line and juggernaut sumo wrestling.

== Attendance ==
Tickets for Call of Duty: XP 2011 went on sale July 19, 2011, at 10:00 am PDT. They were priced at $150 with the restriction of 2 tickets per purchase Tickets were only sold as 2 day passes and only people that were 18 and up could attend. All attendees received a Call of Duty goodie bag and a voucher for the Hardened Edition of Call of Duty: Modern Warfare 3. It is reported that over 6,000 fans lined up to attend the convention. Livestream, the website that hosted the Call of Duty: XP 2011 stream, reported that CoD: XP 2011 was the 2nd most viewed stream in the history of the website.

== Organization ==
=== Schedule ===
Friday, September 2	Event
9:30 am	Registration
11:00 am	"Call of Duty: Modern Warfare 3" Multiplayer Briefing
12:00 pm–7:30 pm	Activities Open
2:00 pm	Pros Vs. G.I. Joes
4:00 pm	"Call of Duty: Elite" - Clans and Groups Panel
5:00 pm	The Voices of Call of Duty Panel
7:00 pm	"Find Makarov: Operation Kingfish" Film Premiere
8:00 pm	Dropkick Murphys Live Performance

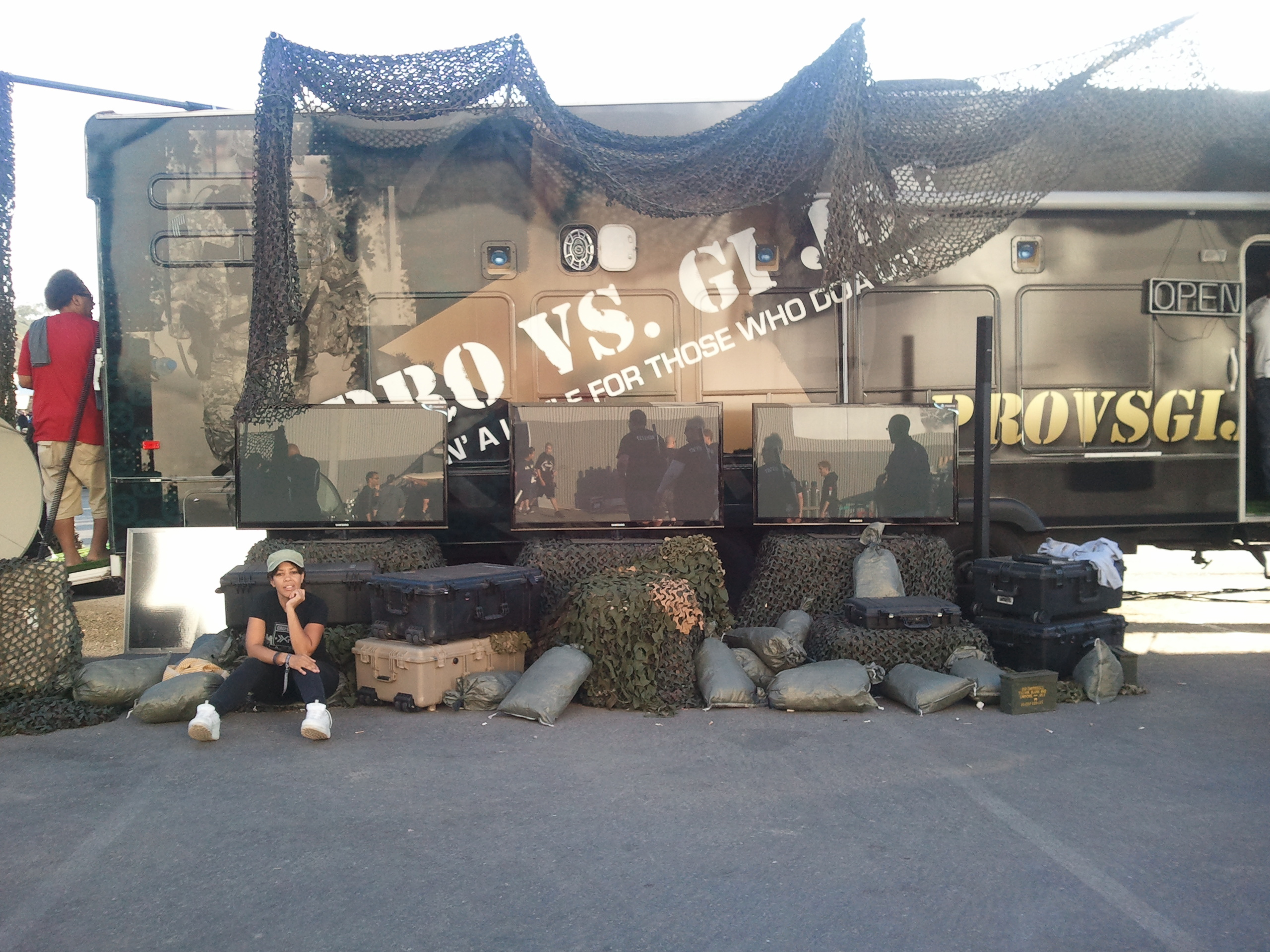
The Pros vs G.I. Joes main gaming truck during the Call of Duty: Experience 2011 event on the second day of the convention.

Saturday, September 3	Event
10:00 am	Doors Open
11:00 am	Gameplay Launches
11:00 am– 7:30 pm	Activities Open
11:00 am	The making of "Call of Duty: Black Ops" Panel
12:00 pm	Call of Duty: Zombies – Origins and Evolutions Panel
2:00 pm	Pros Vs. G.I. Joes
6:30 pm	$1 Million Dollar Tournament Finals
8:00 pm	Kanye West Live Performance

=== $1 million tournament ===
One of the convention's main attractions was the $1 million tournament in which 32 teams of four battled for a $400,000 grand prize. The tournament was single elimination, featured off-site pre-qualifiers. Four slots were left empty to be filled on site by fans who attended. The competition "[featured] a roster of top Call of Duty warriors" who fought to make it in the top 8 to be eligible for some of the prize money. The tournament was shout-cast by Call of Duty pros Hastro and Fwiz. Optic Gaming (U.S.A.) and Team Infinity (U.K.) went head to head in the finals in a variety of Call of Duty: Modern Warfare 3 multiplayer game modes. Optic Gaming won the best of 5 series in four rounds and took the $400,000 prize, while becoming Call of Duty XP's first-ever tournament winners. Optic Gaming (U.S.A) Roster: BigTymeR, MerK, Nadeshot, and Vengeance Team Infinity (UK) Roster: XLNC, Gunshy, Ferluff, Rsoul

Team Optic Vs. Team Infinity final scores

	Capture the Flag	Domination	Kill Confirmed	Search & Destroy
Optic Gaming	4	208	25	4
Team Infinity	1	128	35	2

=== Panels ===
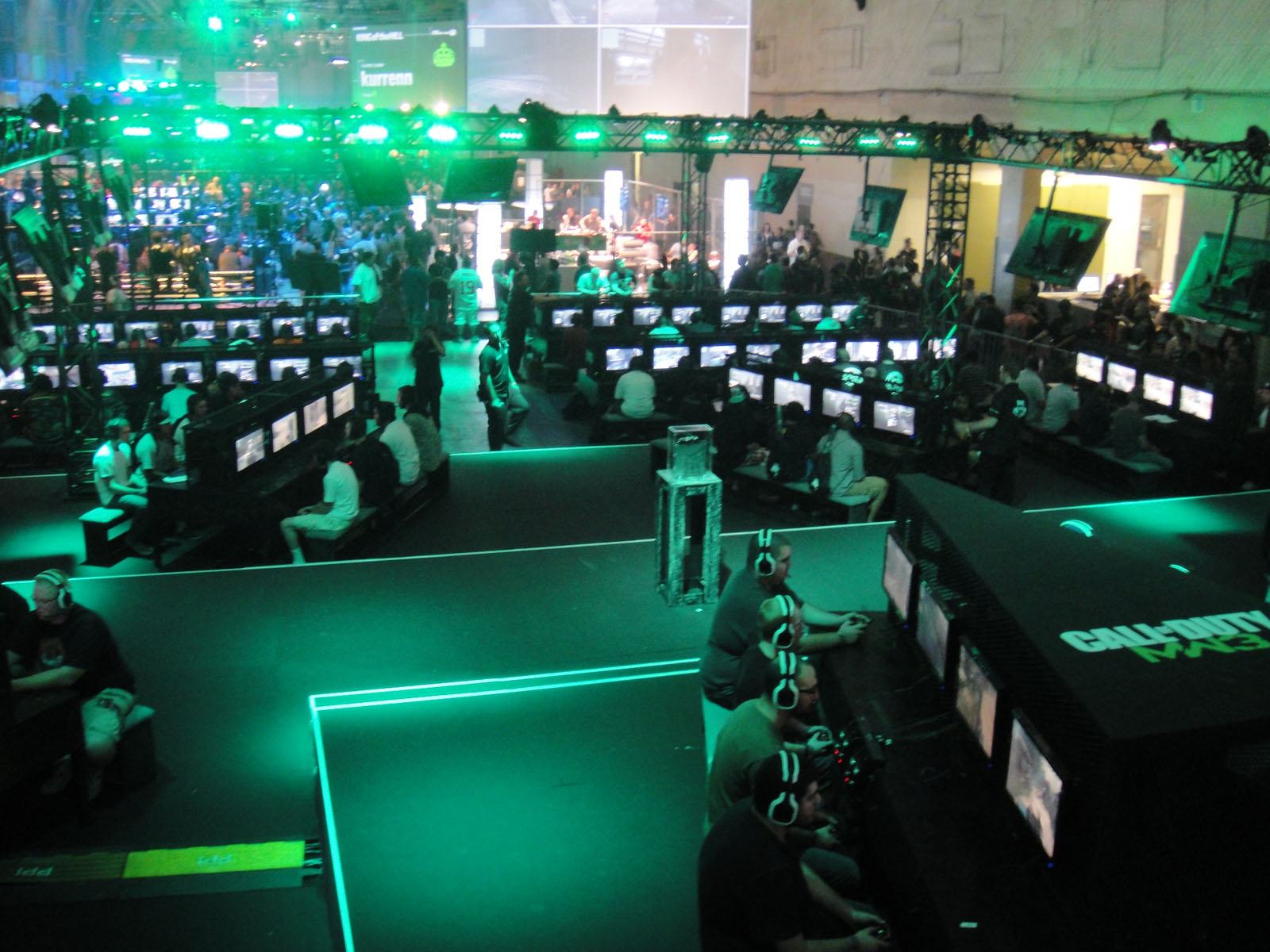
Inside of the Call of Duty: Experience 2011 convention center.

Call of Duty: XP offered fans an opportunity to attend panels sat in on by members of Treyarch, Infinity Ward, and Beachhead Studios. There were 4 official panels with 2 scheduled per day. The first day featured the "Call of Duty: Elite - Clans and Groups Panel" and the "Voices of Call of Duty Panel", while the second day featured "The Making of Call of Duty: Black Ops Multiplayer Panel" and the "Call of Duty: Zombies - Origins and Evolutions Panel". The "Call of Duty: Elite - Clans and Groups Panel" focused primarily on how Call of Duty: Elite will support clans in Modern Warfare 3. The second panel, "Voices of Call of Duty", gave fans an opportunity to get to see the people behind the voice acting in the series. Day 2's panels were dominated by a Treyarch cast. "The Making of Call of Duty: Black Ops Multiplayer Panel" gave fans an inside look at what went into creating the multiplayer experience for Call of Duty: Black Ops. They discussed the map making process, the "Second Chance Perk", player emblems, vehicle, and "quickscoping". In the last panel of the event, "Call of Duty: Zombies - Origins and Evolutions Panel", the development team behind the "Zombies" game mode discussed how they created the zombie levels (and the Easter eggs that were hidden in them), their favorite dialogues, and whether or not "Zombies" will return in the next Treyarch installment.

== Announcements and unveilings ==
=== Call of Duty: Modern Warfare 3 Hardened Edition ===
Activision announced on the first day of the event that the upcoming Call of Duty: Modern Warfare 3 Hardened Edition would include the Modern Warfare 3 game disc with "unique disc art", a 1-year premium membership to Call of Duty: Elite, Special Founder status on Call of Duty: Elite which includes an exclusive in-game emblem, playercard, weapon camouflage, clan XP boost, and more exclusive benefits, collectible steelbook case, exclusive Special Ops Juggernaut Xbox Live outfit for Xbox 360 only, exclusive PSN animated timeline for PS3 only, and a limited edition, collectible field journal, chronicling the entire saga with 100+ pages of "authentic military sketches, diagrams and written entries". The retail price for the Hardened Edition was announced at $99.99.

=== Call of Duty: Elite ===
Activision also took the time to announce and clarify certain aspects about their new free/subscription based service, Call of Duty: Elite. It was stated that the service would be split into two tiers: free and paid. Among the free features announced were Facebook integration and Call of Duty: Elite mobile app which allow players to tweak their player set ups from their mobile. The paid details of the service announced, was first and foremost the price of subscription. A monthly membership is to cost $5 while a yearly membership would cost $49.99. With the paid subscription, Activision Publishing CEO Eric Hirshberg announced that all downloadable content for Call of Duty: Modern Warfare 3 would be included, players can enter contests, more file share space, and much more.

=== Modern Warfare 3 Multiplayer ===
The main event at the convention was the Modern Warfare 3 multiplayer unveiling. Robert Bowling and Michael Condrey revealed several key highlights about the multiplayer in the upcoming game. Killstreaks were announced to have received an overhaul and are now available in strike packages. The strike packages, Assault, Support, and Specialist, will no longer be determined on kills but on points the player receives while playing and on how each strike package serves as a different role in the game. Other announcements about multiplayer included the removal of several controversial perks, the addition of the "Kill Confirmed" game mode, and the addition of weapon proficiency.

== See also ==
- Call of Duty: Modern Warfare 2
- Call of Duty: Modern Warfare 3
- Call of Duty: Black Ops
