= Studio Roqovan =

Defunct game studio

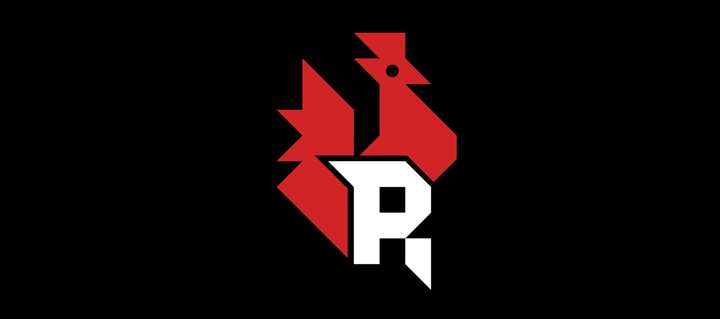
- Type: Private company
- Industry: Virtual reality
- Founded: 2014 (as Reload Studios); 2016 (as Studio Roqovan)
- Defunct: 2019; 7 years ago
- Headquarters: Los Angeles, United States
- Key people: James Chung (CEO); Taehoon Oh (COO)
- Products: World War Toons
- Website: roqovan.com

Studio Roqovan (formally known as Reload Studios) was an American independent game and VR development studio made up of former Infinity Ward and Disney employees. It is headquartered in Los Angeles.

== History ==
Reload Studios was founded by James Chung (CEO) & Taehoon Oh (COO), former employees from Pixar, Disney, and Infinity Ward soon followed to form the core team.

In March 2015, Reload Studios's launched debut title in development, World War Toons, is a class-based multiplayer shooter for VR and consoles.

In 2015, Reload Studios received $2 million and $4 million in funding from World Innovation Lab and other venture capitalists.

In September 2015, Reload Studios launched a non-gaming virtual reality division named Rascali. For their first project, they worked with WoofbertVR to make a virtual re-creation of the Wolfson room from The Courtauld Gallery in London.

In October 2016, Reload Studios rebrand as Studio Roqovan, result of the company growing and reaching for larger corporate goals.

In March 2019, CEO James Chung announced the closer of the studio.

== Games Developed ==
=== World War Toons ===
World War Toons is a multiplayer VR first-person shooter featuring cartoonish World War II soldiers battling in maps in Europe or Africa releasing in October 2016 for both VR and non-VR platforms. The cartoony, class-based shooter sees players battle for supremacy as either the indomitable Axis or the powerful Allies. The game supports variety of play style models.
