= Call of Duty: Elite =

Social networking video game

- 2012 logo used with Black Ops II
- Developer: Beachhead Studios
- Type: Multiplayer online service
- Launched: 8 November 2011; 14 years ago
- Last updated: 5 November 2013; 12 years ago
- Status: Not in Service
- Website: https://web.archive.org/web/20120630133234/http://www.callofduty.com/elite/

Call of Duty: Elite was an online service created by the Activision subsidiary Beachhead Studios for the multiplayer portion for the first-person shooter video game series Call of Duty. The service featured lifetime statistics across multiple games as well as a multitude of social-networking options. The service previously had a premium subscription option during Call of Duty: Modern Warfare 3; however, following the release of Call of Duty: Black Ops II, the service was made free. As of February 28, 2014 at approximately 10:00 a.m. (PST), Activision shut down the Call of Duty: Elite website in favor of their mobile products.

== Call of Duty: Modern Warfare 3 ==
While a free version is available, the subscription based portion of Elite includes exclusive premium features such as monthly downloadable content, daily competitions with virtual and real life prizes, the ability to level up players' clan, pro analysis and strategies, Elite TV, and more.

== Call of Duty: Black Ops II ==
The service previously had a premium subscription option during Call of Duty: Modern Warfare 3; however, it was made free following the release of Call of Duty: Black Ops II.

Elite in Black Ops II offers advanced player performance statistics, a clan management system, leaderboards for the zombie game mode, digital video entertainment, and social integration, mostly features that required a premium subscription in Modern Warfare 3. Call of Duty: Black Ops II downloadable content was released in standard DLC packs available for a nominal fee.

== History ==
It was announced initially by The Wall Street Journal and was showcased at E3 2011 by Activision. The official in-depth reveal took place at Call of Duty: XP in September 2011.

The public beta was released on July 14, 2011 on the Xbox 360 exclusively for Black Ops. Invites for the PlayStation 3 version began being sent out on September 17, 2011. Call of Duty: Elite officially launched on November 8, 2011 to coincide with the release of Modern Warfare 3. The PC version however, will be delayed for an unknown date. In a statement by Beachhead Studios' studio head, Chacko Sonny, the PC version needs to "Ensure a safe PC environment. It's really extensive. We need more time to get there, so Elite on PC will not launch on Day 1." It is not available on the Wii console, due to its lack of internet capabilities. Activison confirmed March 15, 2012 that they are still working on an Elite version for PC players.

Elite was met with intermittent service following the release of Modern Warfare 3. On November 8, 2011, the service was down for non-premium users until December 1, 2011. Beachhead Studios has acknowledged that the console app had seen unprecedented demand and had thus caused many of the outages experienced. After various problems on and around release, Activision decided to automatically extend every paying members' subscription by 30 days. However, PlayStation 3 and PC Premium members are to receive their share of the Elite content after the Xbox 360 Premium members due to an ongoing contract between Microsoft and Activision. Activision also stated that the service will be fully operational to both free and premium users by December 1, 2011.

As of March 31, 2012, there were 10 million players who had signed up for the service, 2 million of which were premium paid members. The service was shut down on February 28, 2014.

== Connectivity ==
Call of Duty: Elite has a console app for the Xbox 360 and PlayStation 3 versions of the game. The console app allows users to access Call of Duty: Elite on their consoles. Elite has a mobile app which allows users to access Call of Duty: Elite on their smartphones. In addition to this Elite has Facebook integration which allows users with Facebook accounts to see their Facebook friends when they come online to any Call of Duty title and allows them to invite their friends to a lobby from the Facebook app. This is now deactivated.

== Elite content releases ==
Elite offered access to downloadable content (DLC), that was called Content Drops, including extra missions and new multiplayer maps. These Drops began with the introduction of the multiplayer maps of Liberation and Piazza being made available to Xbox 360 players on January 24, 2012 and to PlayStation 3 players in February 2012.

The Elite website promised access to "20 new multiplayer maps, Special Ops missions and more" during the Season of Content in 2012. But revealed in Robert Bowling's Twitter page (@fourzerotwo) that there is to be 24 plus content for the 2012 season.

== Shutdown ==
Call of Duty: Elite was shut down on February 28, 2014, after running for over two years. Activision released a statement following the shutdown thanking fans for their support as well as stating that what started as Elite had evolved into the mobile app.
