= Beachhead Studio =

- Type: Video game studio
- Industry: Video game industry
- Founded: 2011
- Headquarters: Santa Monica, California
- Key people: Chacko Sonny (head); Noah Heller (production director); Kent Gambill (engineer)
- Products: Call of Duty Elite, Call of Duty Online, Skylanders: Battlecast
- Parent: Activision Blizzard

Beachhead Studio, also known as Project Beachhead, is a video game studio founded in 2011 and located in Santa Monica, California. It is focused on the development of digital platform and services for Call of Duty series, and takes care on best-in-class online community and online experience.

Team was composed by head Chacko Sonny, production director Noah Heller, and engineer Kent Gambill. It developed video games such as Call of Duty Elite (2011), Call of Duty Online (2012), Call of Duty App and clan wars for Call of Duty Ghost (2013), including Skylanders: Battlecast. In 2012 it won the CSS Design Award.
