= Call of Duty: Modern Warfare 2 =

2009 video game

- Developers: Infinity Ward; Beenox (Campaign Remastered)
- Publisher: Activision
- Director: Jason West
- Producer: Mark Rubin
- Designers: Todd Alderman; Steve Fukuda; Mackey McCandlish; Zied Rieke
- Artist: Richard Kriegler
- Writer: Jesse Stern
- Composer: Lorne Balfe (Note: Hans Zimmer composed the main theme.)
- Series: Call of Duty
- Engine: IW 4.0
- Platforms: PlayStation 3; Windows; Xbox 360; OS X; PlayStation 4 (Note: As part of Call of Duty: Modern Warfare 2 Campaign Remastered which does not include multiplayer); Xbox One
- Release: Windows, PlayStation 3, Xbox 360; November 10, 2009; OS X May 20, 2014; Campaign Remastered; PlayStation 4 March 30, 2020; Windows, Xbox One; April 30, 2020
- Genre: First-person shooter
- Modes: Single-player, multiplayer

Call of Duty: Modern Warfare 2 is a 2009 first-person shooter game developed by Infinity Ward and published by Activision. It is the sixth installment in the Call of Duty series and the direct sequel to Call of Duty 4: Modern Warfare. It was released worldwide on November 10, 2009, for Windows, PlayStation 3, and Xbox 360. A separate version for the Nintendo DS, titled Modern Warfare: Mobilized, was also released on the same day. A version for OS X was developed by Aspyr and released in May 2014, and the Xbox 360 version was made backward compatible for the Xbox One in 2018.

The game's campaign follows Task Force 141, a multinational special forces unit commanded by Captain Soap MacTavish as they hunt Vladimir Makarov, leader of the Russian Ultranationalist party, and United States Army Rangers from the 1st Ranger Battalion who are defending the Washington, D.C. area from a Russian invasion. The game's main playable characters are Sergeant Gary "Roach" Sanderson, of the 141, and Private James Ramirez, of the Army Rangers, with Captain MacTavish becoming playable later in the campaign. The multiplayer mode was expanded upon from the previous game, with several new features and modes.

Development for the game began in 2008, when it was still known as Call of Duty 6. It uses the IW 4.0 engine, an improved version of Call of Duty 4's IW 3.0. Infinity Ward was inspired by real-life conflicts when developing the campaign mode. They initially tested the multiplayer mode by playing an in-house beta version of the game. Modern Warfare 2 was officially announced in February 2009. Teasing of the game began in March, with short trailers being released for the game and, eventually, a full reveal trailer. The multiplayer mode was revealed shortly after. Two downloadable content packs were released for it post-release, each containing five new multiplayer maps, with some being remastered maps from Call of Duty 4.

Modern Warfare 2 received universal acclaim, with praise for its campaign, multiplayer, and amount of content, although it received some criticism for its short length and a lack of innovation. The game was also subject to a controversy surrounding a playable level that had the player participate in a terrorist attack on an airport. Retrospective reviews consider it one of the best games in the series. Within 24 hours of release, the game sold approximately 4.7 million copies in North America and the United Kingdom, ending as the best-selling video game in 2009 in the US. As of 2013, the game had sold 22.7 million copies, becoming one of the best-selling PlayStation 3 video games and best-selling Xbox 360 video games. A sequel, Call of Duty: Modern Warfare 3, was released in 2011 and finishes the original Modern Warfare storyline. A remaster of the game's campaign, Call of Duty: Modern Warfare 2 Campaign Remastered, was released on the PlayStation 4 in March 2020 and April 2020 for Windows and Xbox One.

== Gameplay ==
Players engaging in a gunfight in a multiplayer match. A mini-map is visible in the top left, and match progress in the bottom left.

Call of Duty: Modern Warfare 2 is a first person shooter, and its gameplay revolves around gunfights against enemy combatants. The player controls a soldier who can perform several actions, including jump, sprint, crouch, lay prone, and aim down their gun's iron sights. When the player is shot by an enemy, blood will splatter their heads-up display (HUD), indicating that they have taken damage; if the player avoids gunfire by taking cover, their health will recover automatically within some time limit. The HUD also displays other information, such as a compass, a mini-map, and the player's current ammunition count. The game features traditional guns, including assault rifles, shotguns, handguns, and sniper rifles. The player will be given specific guns at the beginning of each level, but may switch them out with another gun they find (either among dead bodies or near supply unit). Some guns have attachments, such as suppressors, and heartbeat sensors. The player can use grenades and flashbangs when faced with a large group of enemies, as well as a knife for close quarters combat. In some levels, the player will be given special equipment, such as night vision goggles, or a laser designator.

Call of Duty: Modern Warfare 2 has three different game modes: Campaign, Spec Ops, and Multiplayer. Campaign is a single-player mode where the player completes eighteen levels connected by an overarching plot. Each level features a series of objectives to fulfill, and the player will often switch characters between levels. If the player dies during a level, they will respawn at the most recent checkpoint. Levels can be played on one of four difficulties, and each level can be replayed after it has been completed. Spec Ops mode features twenty-three additional levels that can be played individually or cooperatively with a partner. These levels provide specific challenges, such as defusing three bombs within a short period of time. If one player is shot down while playing cooperatively, they will begin crawling, and can shoot enemies with a handgun. If they are not revived by the other player, then they will die and fail the level. There are five tiers of Spec Ops levels, with each tier harder than the previous. Only the first tier is available from the beginning, as later tiers can be unlocked with enough stars. The player earns stars by completing the levels on one of three difficulties, with the number of stars earned corresponding to the difficulty chosen.

Multiplayer mode allows players to compete against each other in team-based and deathmatch-based game types on various maps. Each game type has an objective that requires unique strategies to complete. If the player kills three or more players in a row without dying, they achieve a "killstreak", which gives the player a tactical advantage during a match. These include a Predator missile, a sentry gun, and a tactical nuke. Alternatively, if the player dies several times without a kill, they will be rewarded with a "deathstreak" bonus, which evens the match for the player. A match ends when either a team or player has reached a predefined number of points, or the allotted time expires in which case the team or player with the most points wins. The player's performance in multiplayer is tracked with experience points, which can be earned by killing opposing players, completing objectives, or by completing a match. As the player gains experience, they advance in level, unlocking new weapons. The player will also unlock perks, which modify gameplay elements such as unlimited sprint and increased bullet damage.

== Plot ==
In 2016, after five years of civil war, the Ultranationalists seize control of Russia and Imran Zakhaev becomes a martyr. Diplomatic relations with the United States plummet, while Zakhaev's protégé, Vladimir Makarov, commits terrorist attacks against Europe and America.

PFC Joseph Allen of the 1st Battalion, 75th Ranger Regiment, conducts a combat patrol in Afghanistan with his squadmates Sergeant Foley and Corporal Dunn, impressing his commanding officer, Lieutenant General Shepherd, who reassigns Allen to Task Force 141, a multinational special forces unit. Allen is then embedded with the CIA and adopts a secret identity to infiltrate Makarov's cell, leading to him participating in a mass shooting at Zakhaev International Airport in Moscow, killing numerous Russian civilians. However, Makarov, aware of Allen's true identity, kills him and leaves his body behind to implicate the United States in the attack. Meanwhile, Task Force 141 operatives Sergeant Gary "Roach" Sanderson and Captain John "Soap" MacTavish secure an Attack Characterization System (ACS) module from a downed American satellite from a Russian airbase in the Tian Shan range. Following the massacre, Soap, Roach, Lieutenant Simon "Ghost" Riley, and several other members of Task Force 141 are sent to Rio de Janeiro to capture Alejandro Rojas, Makarov's arms dealer.

In retaliation for the airport massacre, Russia launches a surprise invasion on East Coast of the United States, facilitated by their earlier capture of the ACS module, which allowed them to disable NORAD's satellite network. Foley's squad, including Allen's replacement Private James Ramirez, alongside other Army Rangers, defends Northern Virginia before holding out against Russian forces in Washington, D.C. Under interrogation, Rojas reveals that Makarov's most hated enemy is an individual known as "Prisoner 627", imprisoned in a gulag in Kamchatka Krai. With the United States unable to send assistance due to the war, Task Force 141 is forced to escape Rio de Janeiro with aid from Soap's old contact, Nikolai. Task Force 141 then links up with U.S. Navy SEALs to rescue hostages and neutralize S.A.M. sites aboard oilrigs, before breaking into the gulag and rescuing the prisoner, who is revealed to be Soap's former commanding officer Captain John Price. (Note: As depicted in Find Makarov: Operation Kingfish (2011))

Price rejoins Task Force 141, and to give American forces a much-needed advantage in repelling the invasion, leads a raid on a Russian nuclear submarine and launches an SLBM which detonates above D.C. in the upper atmosphere, destroying the International Space Station. The blast creates an electromagnetic pulse, disabling all electronic equipment but giving the defending Americans the advantage. Foley's squad launches a counterattack to retake the White House and stop a U.S. Air Force bombing run from destroying the city to deny it to the Russians. The bombing run is aborted, and with other high-value locations being recaptured, the Americans retake D.C. Meanwhile, Task Force 141 splits up in search of Makarov – Roach and Ghost lead half of the team to Makarov's safehouse on the Georgia–Russia border, while Soap and Price lead the other half to an aircraft boneyard in Afghanistan. At the safehouse, the team downloads a wealth of intelligence, but when they reach the extraction point, Shepherd betrays the team and executes Roach and Ghost, taking the module with the intelligence for himself. His private military company Shadow Company eliminates the rest of the unit. Meanwhile, Soap and Price are caught in the crossfire between Shepherd's and Makarov's forces, but escape with Nikolai's help.

In the face of a mutual enemy, Price and Soap forge a temporary truce with Makarov, who reluctantly reveals Shepherd's location. Price and Soap then launch a vengeful suicide mission, infiltrating Shepherd's base in Afghanistan. After a lengthy pursuit, the duo corners the general, who stabs Soap in the chest. As Shepherd prepares to execute Soap, he reveals that he was the commanding officer who lost his men after the nuclear detonation in 2011, (Note: As depicted in Call of Duty 4: Modern Warfare (2007)) and that he leaked Allen's identity to Makarov to start a war with Russia to become a war hero, betraying Task Force 141 to cover this up. Price then intervenes and engages in a fistfight with Shepherd, giving Soap enough time to pull the knife from his chest and throw it at Shepherd, killing him. Nikolai arrives by helicopter and evacuates Price and Soap, leading them to safety.

== Development ==
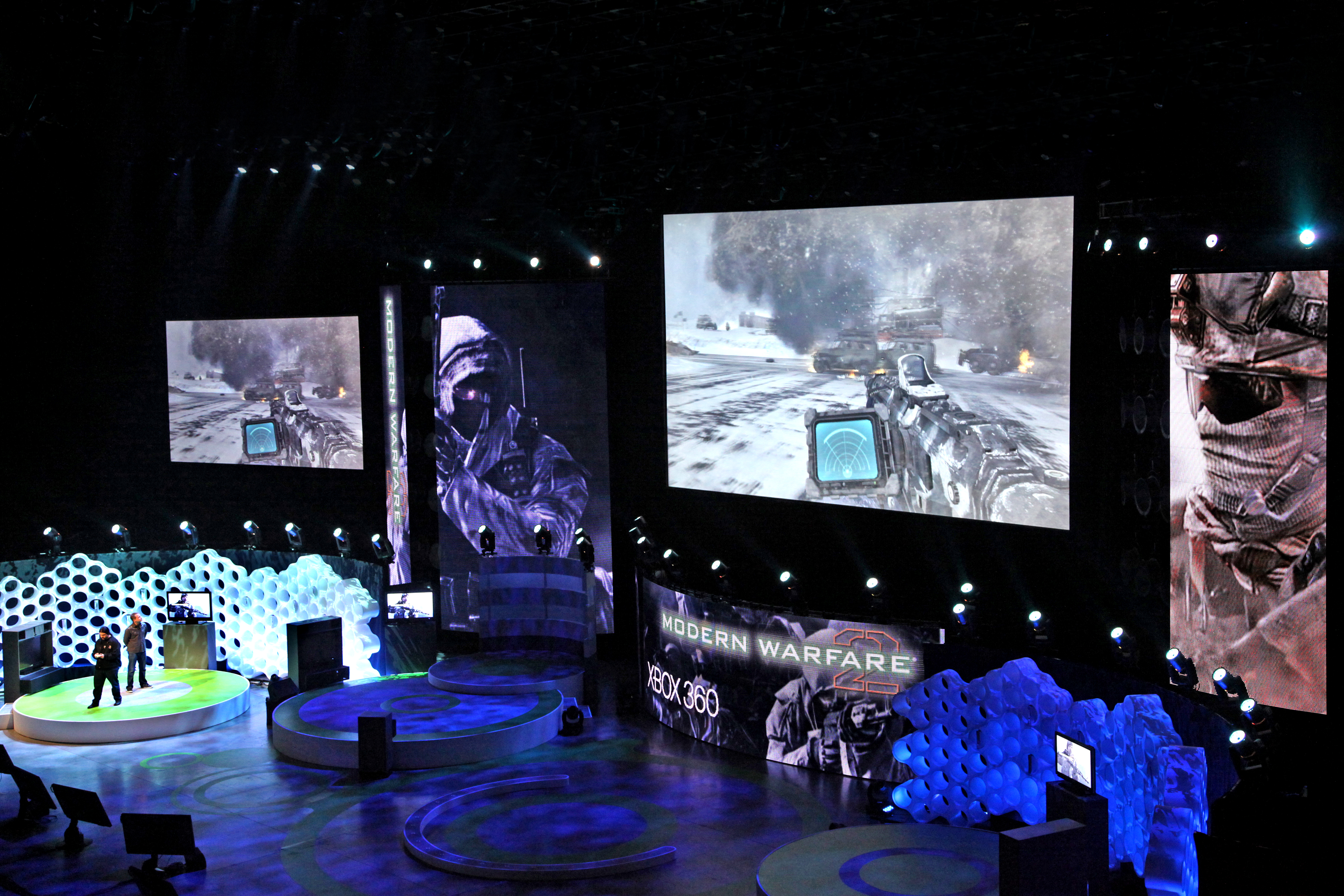
West and Zampella present the “Cliffhanger” mission at the Xbox 360 press conference during E3 2009 on June 1, 2009.

Modern Warfare 2 was originally announced as Call of Duty 6. The game was first announced under the title Call of Duty: Modern Warfare 2 by Activision on December 3, 2008. Activision subsequently retracted its announcement, stating that any information about an upcoming Call of Duty game was "speculative." Infinity Ward then asserted that it had not officially confirmed its latest project at that time. On February 11, 2009, Activision officially announced Modern Warfare 2 and set a tentative release date for "Holiday 2009." The game was tested in an internal beta by the development team. While both Call of Duty 4 and Call of Duty: World at War had been preceded by public multiplayer betas, no such beta was released for Modern Warfare 2 because it was determined that, according to Community Manager Robert Bowling, no public beta was needed unless the internal beta did not provide adequate feedback. While Treyarch was able to port Modern Warfare to the Wii and release it on the same day Modern Warfare 2 was released, Infinity Ward declined to make a Wii version of the sequel. According to Bowling, Infinity Ward determined that the Wii's technical limitations made it impossible to deliver the same cinematic experience that the sequel aspired to present.

Infinity Ward announced in October 2009 that the PC version of Modern Warfare 2 would not support the use of user-run dedicated servers or in-game console commands. This announcement was received poorly by some members of the PC community, eventually instigating a response from Infinity Ward in an attempt to put the community at ease. During brainstorming sessions, an idea came forth on what if the ending of Modern Warfare was a loss, leading to the sequel. In an interview with Jesse Stern, he talked to producers of Infinity Ward with ideas such as "outbreaks, viruses, chemical warfare, and even outlandish things such as aliens and the living dead." Stern mentioned having the game based on real-life conflicts before they halted further planning at first due to events in the 2008 South Ossetia war and in the Mumbai terrorist attacks.

=== Game engine ===
The game utilizes the in-house IW 4.0 game engine, which is claimed to be a generation beyond the capabilities of the engine used in Call of Duty 4. Although proprietary, the game is based on an unspecified id Tech engine, and can accommodate larger worlds, enhanced graphic detail, and more efficient rendering. Infinity Ward has addressed the issue of enemies that continually respawn at different points of a level. The developer demonstrated that the game engine uses a "dynamic AI", which has replaced the infinite respawn system and allows enemies to act more independently. These "smarter" enemies are designed to actively seek out and drive the player forward through a level, and can break away from set behaviors such as following a designated route in order to attack. The player cannot depend on enemies to be found in the same locations as a previous play-through because enemies will behave differently each time a level is played.

=== Audio ===
On August 20, 2009, Robert Bowling revealed through Twitter that Kevin McKidd, Craig Fairbrass, Barry Pepper, Keith David, and Glenn Morshower were confirmed voice actors for the game. It was later confirmed that McKidd would voice the protagonist, "Soap" MacTavish. Fairbrass, who voiced Gaz in Call of Duty 4, provided voice work for "Ghost". Billy Murray reprised his role as Captain Price from Call of Duty 4. Rapper 50 Cent provided voice work for the Special Ops and multiplayer modes, portraying "one of the squad [member] voices." The main theme of Call of Duty: Modern Warfare 2 was provided by Hollywood composer Hans Zimmer, while the rest of the score was composed by Lorne Balfe. The soundtrack was released on June 1, 2010. The iTunes page for the soundtrack incorrectly lists Zimmer as the soundtrack's only composer.

== Marketing and release ==
On March 25, 2009, a teaser trailer for the game was revealed at the Game Developer Choice Awards ceremony in San Francisco. The teaser was posted on Infinity Ward's website, and released on the Xbox Live Marketplace and the PlayStation Network a short time later. A second teaser was released on May 10, 2009, and showed gameplay features such as snowmobile driving and underwater actions. The teaser announced that the game would be "revealed" on TNT during the NBA Eastern Conference Finals on May 24, 2009. The "reveal" was the first full-length trailer, which debuted extended sequences of actual in-game scenes and combat; the trailer was subsequently made available on the Modern Warfare 2 official website, which was kept updated for the occasion. A fourth trailer was released on July 27, 2009, and showed the first footage of the game's multiplayer mode. On October 4, 2009, a second full-length cinematic trailer was released and revealed that part of the game would take place in a war-torn Washington, D.C.

On July 21, 2009, Infinity Ward's Robert Bowling revealed through Twitter that a Modern Warfare 2 controller was in the works. Peripherals manufacturer Mad Catz was contracted by Activision to create a line of Modern Warfare 2 controllers and accessories for all platforms that the game would be available on. Activision stated, in its quarterly earnings report, that pre-orders for the game had broken a company record; more copies of Modern Warfare 2 had been pre-ordered than any other game that the company had published before. In September 2009, Monster Energy teamed up with Activision to bring special redeemable codes on the Monster Energy website, where people may submit codes included in Monster Energy packs to redeem items such as Xbox 360 Premium Themes and a Modern Warfare 2 Map Pack code.

In October 2009, Infinity Ward posted a video titled "Fight Against Grenade Spam" on YouTube. In the video, professional baseball player Cole Hamels delivers a public service announcement that advocates against the use of grenade spam. Hamels uses profanity in the video, calling grenade spam "for pussies", and says "what the fuck" when he is blown up with grenades. Multiple game journalists, including Phillip Kollar of Game Informer, criticized the title's acronym, F.A.G.S. (a pejorative term for gay people) as condoning the use of homophobic slurs. Infinity Ward community manager Robert Bowling claimed the video was intended as a social commentary joke about the "gamer" stereotype, but ultimately decided to remove the video from YouTube after being convinced the joke went too far.

=== Title ===
The original teaser trailer confirmed that the game's title of Call of Duty: Modern Warfare 2 was officially shortened to just Modern Warfare 2. After photographs of the official retail boxes were posted by Robert Bowling, Activision confirmed that the standard-version Modern Warfare 2 packaging would feature the Call of Duty brand logo in order to reflect the game's association with the Call of Duty franchise. It is speculated that the decision was influenced by findings that brand awareness for the game was significantly lower without the Call of Duty logo. However, the developers still prefer to simply call the game Modern Warfare 2 as they consider it a new IP. The menus in the game also refer to the title as simply Modern Warfare 2.

=== Retail versions ===
Modern Warfare 2 was released in four different retail versions across the PlayStation 3 and Xbox 360 platforms: Standard, Hardened, Veteran, and Prestige. The standard version consists of the game and an instructional manual, and is the only version available for the Windows platform. The Hardened Edition consists of the game and manual (which are packaged in a steel book case), an art book, and a token that allows one to download Call of Duty Classic, a high-definition version of the original Call of Duty game, from Xbox Live Arcade or the PlayStation Store (Classic was released individually on December 2, 2009). The Prestige Edition contains all the elements of the Hardened Edition as well as a set of fully functioning night vision goggles imprinted with the Modern Warfare 2 logo and a stand modeled after the head of the character "Soap" MacTavish. The goggles are powered by five AA batteries and can see up to 50 feet in absolute darkness.

On September 15, 2009, Activision and Microsoft jointly announced a special, limited Modern Warfare 2 version of the Xbox 360 Elite with a 250 GB hard drive. The unit is highlighted by special game product branding and includes two black wireless Xbox 360 controllers, a black wired headset, an ethernet cable, a standard definition composite A/V cable, and a physical copy of the game in the standard version. This is the first Xbox 360 console to come with a 250 GB hard drive. On September 18, UK and rep of Ireland retailer GAME announced a Veteran Edition of Modern Warfare 2 would be exclusive to rep of Ireland and UK. It comes with a 12-inch (30 cm) statue of "Soap" MacTavish with interchangeable arms and weapons and has the same contents as the Hardened Edition. In September 2009, a Veteran Statue Bundle of Modern Warfare 2 was posted on the EB Games website and is available for all platforms.

Modern Warfare 2 was ported to the Nintendo DS with the title Call of Duty: Modern Warfare: Mobilized and a different storyline, released on November 10, 2009. It was also ported to OS X by Aspyr years after the game's original release. This version was released on May 20, 2014, alongside the OS X port for Call of Duty: Modern Warfare 3. The Xbox 360 version of Modern Warfare 2 was made backward compatible with the Xbox One on August 28, 2018.

=== Downloadable content ===
Activision announced that two downloadable map packs would be released for Modern Warfare 2. At E3 2009, Microsoft stated that these map packs would first be made available for the Xbox 360 via Xbox Live before they would be released for other platforms. Robert Bowling stated that the community response to the game and the first ten downloadable map packs would be used in designing other potential map packs.

The first map pack, titled the "Stimulus Package" was released first for Xbox Live on March 30, 2010 and for PlayStation Network and PC on May 4, 2010, in North America. The pack contains five maps: reincarnations of the Crash and Overgrown maps from Call of Duty 4, and three new maps: Bailout, a multi-level apartment complex; Storm, an industrial park littered with heavy machinery; and Salvage, an abandoned car junkyard in the middle of the snow. Within 24 hours of its release, it was downloaded over one million times. Within the first week it had been downloaded 2.5 million times, breaking Xbox Live DLC records. In addition to integrating the maps into all existing game types, the Stimulus Package adds two new game modes, randomizing the built-in game types in either normal or hardcore mode.

Activision released the second downloadable map pack, titled the "Resurgence Package", exclusively for Xbox Live on June 3, 2010, in North America. This release was followed by the PlayStation Network and PC versions on July 6 in North America and on July 7 worldwide. The package includes five new multiplayer maps: reincarnations of the Strike and Vacant maps from Call of Duty 4, and three new maps: Carnival, a desolated amusement park; Trailer Park, a mobile home park; and Fuel, an oil refinery. Both of the map packs were made available for purchase on OS X on May 20, 2014, when the OS X port of the game was released.

=== Comic ===
A six-part comic book mini-series related to the game has also been produced. Announced by Robert Bowling on August 17, 2009, Modern Warfare 2: Ghost is focused on the backstory of the character Ghost, who appears in the video game as a member of Task Force 141. The series is published by WildStorm. The first issue of the series debuted on November 11, 2009.

=== Short film ===
A fan-made prequel to Modern Warfare 2, entitled Find Makarov: Operation Kingfish, premiered at Call of Duty: XP 2011. The video was produced by We Can Pretend, visual effects by The Junction, and was endorsed by Activision. The first film, Find Makarov, was a non-canon fan made film. Activision contacted We Can Pretend about the video and helped produce a second canon short film, Find Makarov: Operation Kingfish. The prequel tells the story of how Task Force 141 first tried to capture Vladimir Makarov, who was known then as Kingfish. It also tells how Soap got his facial scars, and how Price was captured and incarcerated in a gulag.

== Reception ==
Reception

Aggregate score
Aggregator	Score
Metacritic	(PC) 86/100 (PS3) 94/100 (X360) 94/100

Review scores
Publication	Score
1Up.com	A
Computer and Video Games	9.4/10
Destructoid	9.5/10
Famitsu	39/40
G4	5/5
Game Informer	9.75/10
GamePro	5/5
GameSpot	9.0/10
GameSpy	5/5
GamesRadar+	10/10
GameTrailers	9.5/10
IGN	9.5/10
Joystiq	4/5
Official Xbox Magazine (UK)	10/10
Official Xbox Magazine (US)	9.5/10
PC Gamer (UK)	80%
PC Gamer (US)	80%
TeamXbox	9.7/10
X-Play	5/5
The Escapist	4/5
The Daily Telegraph	10/10
The Guardian	5/5

Awards
Publication	Award
IGN	Editor's Choice
GamePro	Editor's Choice
BAFTA	GAME Award (2009)
GameTrailers	Game of the Year 2009
PakGamers	Best Xbox 360 Game of 2009
GameSpot	Best Shooter/Readers Choice
GameTrailers	Best First-Person Shooter
Destructoid	Editor's Choice
Academy of Interactive Arts & Sciences	Action Game of the Year, Outstanding Achievement in Online Gameplay (2010)
Golden Joystick Awards	Shooter of the Year, in association with ITN Game On

Call of Duty: Modern Warfare 2 received "universal acclaim" for the PlayStation 3 and Xbox 360 versions, and "generally positive" reviews for the PC version, according to review aggregator website Metacritic. Reviewers praised the in-depth story mode, mini missions, and multiplayer.

1UP.com stated "Mixing real-world locations with bombastic set-pieces MW2 continues the guided, thrill-ride experiences of its predecessor, and adds even more depth to its multiplayer offerings. It might not have fixed all the problems from the first game, but there's just so much quality content packed into this game that it will almost certainly be one of the most-played games in your library for a long time to come". Game Informer noted praised the game for its polish and iteration on the series, as well as its strong presentation and wealth of playable content. IGN called it a "no-brainer purchase", thanks to its online multiplayer, its co-op mode, and its campaign. GameTrailers stated "The air of unpredictability and the care that was paid to each separate element puts it in lofty company. The multiplayer hasn't received an overhaul, but considering most shooters are still playing catch-up with Call of Duty 4, the tweaks and twists make it the best multiplayer shooting experience in the industry. Few games manage to meet such high expectations". Computer and Video Games called the game "Loud, epic and incredibly polished, [and] this year's biggest must-have shooter".

Criticism of the game focused on the short length of the single player campaign. IGN's Mark Bozon remarks that the single-player of "Modern Warfare 2 is surprisingly short, and doesn't live up to the standard set by previous Call of Duty games." In addition, many reviewers have complained about the lack of innovation to the formula of the series.

The game's Windows version was also criticized for lacking dedicated servers and being powered by IWNet. Infinity Ward went on to state that it would lack console commands, not support larger than 18 player multiplayer matches, or allow players to ban cheaters. Ben Kuchera of Ars Technica commented that, "at launch, this will be one of the most locked-down, inflexible, and gamer-unfriendly games ever created", and an online petition for dedicated servers surpassed 150,000 signatures in ten days. Nevertheless, in response, Mike Griffiths, CEO of Activision, claimed that the omission of dedicated servers would offer an "easier multiplayer experience". While only 3% of the game's sales came from the Windows version in the UK, it still outsold the Windows version of Call of Duty 4: Modern Warfare in its first week.

Some game journalists accused the developers of cultural insensitivity, citing the use of Arabic rather than Urdu on signs and banners in the Karachi multiplayer map, based on the real-life city of Karachi in Pakistan. An Easter egg in the game's tutorial level in which one soldier asks another soldier about his sexuality, and then remarks "don't ask, don't tell", led to further criticism, though some journalists considered the reaction to the line overblown.

Famitsu named Modern Warfare 2 as the number one game on the top 10 video games sold in 2009, beating games such as Metal Gear Solid 4, Uncharted 2: Among Thieves, Halo 3 and Grand Theft Auto IV. It also gave the game a score of 39/40, being one of the few Western games released in Japan to have the same score as Grand Theft Auto IV. In 2011, readers of Guinness World Records Gamer's Edition voted Simon "Ghost" Riley as the 40th-top video game character of all time.

=== Sales and revenue ===
According to preliminary sales figures from Activision, Modern Warfare 2 sold approximately 4.7 million units in the United States and the UK combined in the first 24 hours of its release. The total revenue from first day sales in the U.S. and the UK was $310 million, making Modern Warfare 2 the biggest entertainment launch in history at the time, surpassing in revenue its previous record holder, Grand Theft Auto IV, as well as items from other media types. After five days of sales, the game had earned revenue figures of $550 million worldwide. As of 13 January 2010, it has taken over $1 billion in sales. Activision also claims that Modern Warfare 2 had 8 million players online within the first five days, constituting the largest 'army' of players in the world. On March 8, 2010, Robert Bowling announced that the game had amassed 25 million unique players. In June 2010, Activision's CFO Thomas Tippl revealed that the game had sold 20 million copies. In August 2011, Activision Publishing CEO Eric Hirshberg revealed that the game had sold 22 million copies. A month later in September 2011, Modern Warfare 3 producer Mark Rubin, said that the game's number (not confirmed as players or sales) was between 28 and 29 million. In November 2013, IGN put the game's sales at 22.7 million.

According to the NPD Group, Modern Warfare 2 sold approximately 4.2 million units for the Xbox 360 and 1.87 million units for the PlayStation 3 in the U.S. during the month of November 2009. In Japan, Modern Warfare 2 sold 64,000 copies for the PlayStation 3 and 42,000 copies for the Xbox 360 in its first week of sales. The game later sold 117,000 copies on the PlayStation 3 and 61,000 on the Xbox 360. Anita Frazier of the NPD Group reported in March 2010 that the game had sold slightly under 10 million copies in the U.S. alone. The game had also become the second best-selling game of all time in both the UK and the U.S.

After it became backward compatible with the Xbox One, the NPD Group reported that Modern Warfare 2 was the eighth-best selling video game in the United States during August 2018. It had sold more copies in that month than the then-most recent entry in the series, Call of Duty: WWII, which came out in November 2017. During the previous month, before becoming backward compatible, Modern Warfare 2 was at only number 321 on the best sellers list.

=== Awards ===
Modern Warfare 2 received awards from various gaming sites and publications, it gained high praise from some video game magazines. At the 2009 Spike Video Game Awards, Modern Warfare 2 received the Best Shooter and Best Multiplayer awards. Both GameSpy and GameTrailers gave the game the Best Overall Game of 2009 award and received from GameTrailers six awards overall. GameSpot and Metacritic, both gave it the Best Xbox 360 Game award, and from GameTrailers received the game the Best Multiplayer award including the Best First-Person Shooter award. At the 6th British Academy Games Awards, it won the GAME Award which was selected via a public vote. During the 13th Annual Interactive Achievement Awards, the Academy of Interactive Arts & Sciences awarded Modern Warfare 2 with "Action Game of the Year" and "Outstanding Achievement in Online Gameplay", along with receiving nominations for "Game of the Year" and outstanding achievement in "Animation", "Art Direction", "Game Design", "Original Music Composition", "Sound Design", and "Visual Engineering".

=== "No Russian" controversy ===
Gameplay screenshot of "No Russian", depicting the player character aiming at a crowd of civilians

In the campaign's "No Russian" level, the player controls an undercover CIA agent who participates in a mass shooting at a Moscow airport to gain the trust of a Russian terrorist group. It begins with the player walking out of an elevator with four other gunmen, who proceed to open fire on a large group of civilians at a security checkpoint. The player then accompanies the gunmen as they walk through the airport, killing any remaining civilians. The only legitimate targets are a group of security personnel encountered in waves throughout the airport interior, and a more heavily armed gang of riot squad and FSB members deployed on the tarmac. The level is very graphic, as screams can be heard throughout, and the injured crawl away leaving blood trails or perch themselves on tables and stands as they bleed out. However, the player is never forced to partake in the massacre, and may instead let their comrades kill the civilians. If the player does not feel comfortable during the level, they are allowed to skip to the next level with no penalties whatsoever.

Prior to the game's release, footage taken from "No Russian" was leaked on the Internet. Some journalists decided to wait until they could actually play the level to judge its merits. After the game's release, the level was largely criticized for allowing players to partake in a terrorist attack. Vince Horiuchi of The Salt Lake Tribune felt that the level was in poor taste following the 2009 Fort Hood shooting, and questioned why its content couldn't have been shown in a non-interactive cutscene. Marc Cieslak of BBC News was saddened by "No Russian", as he felt it disproved his theory that the video game industry had "grown up". Several prominent British religious leaders condemned the level in an episode of The Big Questions: Alexander Goldberg of the London Jewish Forum was worried that children would play it; Fazan Mohammed of the British Muslim Forum described it as an intimate experience of enacting terrorism; and Stephen Lowe, the retired Bishop of Hulme, felt that it was "sickening". In the same episode, Network N executive James Binns instead argued that the game had been appropriately classified as 'mature' (18+) and that it was therefore at the discretion of guardians to safeguard their children: "This is an adult piece of entertainment. We can make all entertainment for children, or we can take proper steps to try and protect children from adult entertainment." Due to the level's graphic content, the game was censored in international versions, and the level was removed entirely from the Russian version.

=== Retrospective reviews ===
Retrospective assessments rank Call of Duty: Modern Warfare 2 as one of the best games in the franchise, if not the best. Critics wrote that the game expanded on the standards set by Modern Warfare, with several arguing that Infinity Ward outdid themselves with the sequel. Dan Weneroweicz of Complex wrote: "Nearly everything in Modern Warfare 2 was high quality and prioritized fun over anything else. It was a perfect combo of gameplay in that era that will be hard to ever replicate again." The campaign has been called one of Call of Duty's finest, with critics highlighting its theatricality, spectacle, pacing, missions (particularly the shock of "No Russian"), and emotional weight.

The game's multiplayer was praised for expanding on Modern Warfare's with restructured loadout and perk systems, additional killstreaks and progression challenges, and new weapons that allowed for cinematic moments for players, such as sniper "quick-scoping". The map design was also commended; several of the game's multiplayer maps, such as Terminal and Rust, became fan-favorites. ComicBook.com's Cade Onder called Modern Warfare 2 "one of the most defining multiplayer experiences of its generation", while TheGamer's Cian Maher called it the best multiplayer shooter of all time in 2021. Nevertheless, several acknowledged unbalancing issues that made the mode frustrating to play at times and even game-breaking, particularly noting the Tactical Nuke killstreak and "noob-tubing" grenade launchers. Critics have also highlighted Modern Warfare 2's cooperative Spec Ops mode as one of the series' best modes.

== Remastered version ==
Call of Duty: Modern Warfare 2 Campaign Remastered, a visually-updated version of the original, was released for PlayStation 4 on March 31, 2020, and for Xbox One and Microsoft Windows on April 30, 2020. It only includes the campaign mode with no multiplayer and Spec Ops components; when purchased players unlock various cosmetic items in 2019's Call of Duty: Modern Warfare and 2020's Call of Duty: Warzone. The remaster features improved models and art along with remade cutscenes with new motion capture, as well as a revamped post-process pipeline and HDR support. It was developed on a more advanced version of Sledgehammer Games' engine from Call of Duty: Advanced Warfare with modifications from Beenox. On Metacritic, the PlayStation 4 and PC versions of the remaster hold a weighted average score of 71 out of 100, indicating "mixed or average reviews".

== Notes and references ==
=== Bibliography ===
- Infinity Ward (2009). Call of Duty: Modern Warfare 2 instruction manual. Activision.
- Marcus, Phillip; Sea Snipers (2009). Call of Duty: Modern Warfare 2 Signature Series Strategy Guide. BradyGames. ISBN 9780744011647.
