= Call of Duty: Ghosts =

2013 first-person shooter video game

- Developer: Infinity Ward (Note: The Wii U version of the game was developed by Treyarch. Neversoft developed the game's Extinction mode. Other additional work by High Moon Studios, Nerve Software, Demonware, FreeStyle Games Limited and Beachhead Studios. Raven Software developed the game's multiplayer mode. Certain Affinity also supported Raven Software's development in the game's multiplayer mode.)
- Publisher: Activision
- Writer: Stephen Gaghan
- Composer: David Buckley
- Series: Call of Duty
- Engine: IW 6.0
- Platforms: PlayStation 3 Wii U Windows; Xbox 360; PlayStation 4 Xbox One
- Release: PlayStation 3, Wii U, Windows, & Xbox 360: WW: November 5, 2013; PlayStation 4: NA: November 15, 2013; EU: November 29, 2013; Xbox One: WW: November 22, 2013
- Genre: First-person shooter
- Modes: Single-player, multiplayer

Call of Duty: Ghosts is a 2013 first-person shooter game developed by Infinity Ward and published by Activision. It is the tenth major installment in the Call of Duty series and the sixth developed by Infinity Ward. It was released for PlayStation 3, Wii U, Windows, Xbox 360, PlayStation 4, and Xbox One in November 2013.

The game acts as a standalone installment in the wider Call of Duty franchise in lieu of the World War II, Black Ops and Modern Warfare series that preceded it. Ghosts inherits much of the core gameplay and structure of previous titles, with a mission-based campaign and an open-ended multiplayer, though it has an increased focus on tactical gameplay, including the addition of new "Squads" modes and orbital strike superweapons to the multiplayer. The single-player campaign follows a protracted high-tech war against a dictatorial united South America. Ghosts also features an alternative co-operative shooter mode titled Extinction, acting as a spiritual successor to the Zombies co-operative PvE game modes introduced to the franchise in Call of Duty: World at War.

Ghosts received mixed reviews from critics, with praise for its multiplayer gameplay and the Extinction mode, and criticism for its single-player campaign, rehashing of familiar concepts, and general lack of innovation. Retrospective reviews have been generally negative, with the game placing low in lists ranking the series' games. Because of its reception, and coinciding with the launch of eighth generation consoles, it failed to meet Activision's expectations. Ghosts was the last Call of Duty game to be released on a Nintendo system until Call of Duty: Modern Warfare 4 on the Nintendo Switch 2 in 2026.

== Gameplay ==
A playable German Shepherd named Riley, who is part of the player's squad

=== Campaign ===
In Call of Duty: Ghosts, the story is mostly told through the eyes of Logan Walker, with several other playable characters, including an astronaut specialist named Baker; Sergeant Thompson; Elias Walker, member of Ghosts and Logan's father; and the newer option to play as a German Shepherd, Riley, the first non-human playable character in the franchise.

=== Multiplayer ===
The multiplayer mode in Call of Duty: Ghosts features changes from previous Call of Duty games as some new mechanics have been added to it. Maps now have areas that can be altered or destroyed. There is a nuke-like kill streak reward, the KEM Strike. The player can get the ODIN kill streak by either getting a certain amount of kills or by killing the top player on the other team and then completing various challenges after picking up a blue briefcase that is dropped. The sniper rifle scopes also have new "dual render technology" allowing the player to see around the outside of the scope (although blurred) when zoomed in. The game features playable female soldiers.

==== Squads ====
Call of Duty: Ghosts introduces a new game type called Squads. This mode can be played either solo or with other players, including friends. A squad consists of ten different customizable characters. Squads can be utilized in unique gamemodes involving AI-controlled enemies and squad mates. The game modes include Squad Assault, Safeguard, Safeguard Infinite, Squad vs Squad, and Wargame. All of these modes can be played while online or offline.

==== Multiplayer game modes ====
Call of Duty: Ghosts features several staple multiplayer game modes, including Team Deathmatch, Kill Confirmed, Search and Destroy, Domination, and Free For All, while introducing several new game types, including Cranked and Blitz. In Cranked, once a player kills an enemy, becoming "Cranked", the player who earned the kill has 30 seconds to earn a subsequent kill. If they do not earn a subsequent kill within 30 seconds, they blow up. In Blitz, a mode similar to Capture the Flag, the player needs to go to a portal located at the enemy's spawn point while preventing players from the enemy team from reaching theirs. These portals are temporarily closed for 10 seconds when they are captured to prevent players from rushing. In Infected, similar to the mode in Modern Warfare 3, one player is randomly infected at the beginning and can infect other players until either all survivors are infected, or time runs out. Playlists will rotate between several different scenarios involving various loadouts. This mode allows up to 18 players on Xbox One, PlayStation 4, and PC versions and up to 12 players on the other platforms. The Xbox One, PlayStation 4, and PC versions of the game featured Ground War, a more expansive version of the Domination and Team Deathmatch modes with more players. Gun Game was added in a later update.

=== Extinction ===
Extinction is a 4-player co-op mode, which pits the player(s) against various types of aliens (known altogether as Cryptids) in a base-defending survival style map. The main goal is usually to destroy all of the Cryptid hives scattered across the map (except Awakening and Exodus; the former requires players to scan for obelisks in an area that needs to be destroyed, while Exodus features generators that the players have to activate). Players choose from four different class types, with unique traits and customizable loadouts. The player(s) can level up their classes, unlocking more weapons and equipment for their loadouts. This mode is unlocked by finishing the first level of the Campaign.

The first map, "Point of Contact", is included within the base game and serves as an introduction to the game mode. The map takes place in an abandoned city in Colorado, two weeks after the events of the campaign mission "Ghost Stories".

The second map, "Nightfall", was released as part of the Onslaught DLC pack. The map takes place in an Alaskan research facility, 14 weeks after "Point of Contact", and introduces two new story characters: Dr. Samantha Cross and Captain David Archer. The map also introduces two new types of Cryptid aliens, one of which (the Breeder) serves as a boss-type enemy. Players are also given access to a mysterious and powerful weapon: The Venom X. Players can unlock several pieces of intel, revealing details about Cross and Archer.

The third map, "Mayday", was released as part of the Devastation DLC pack. The map takes place on board a Naval ship, 26 days after the events in "Nightfall", and introduces two more new types of Cryptids: The Seeder (Which looks like the red seekers) but is bright orange and spawns' plantlike turrets that shoot projectiles at the players, and the Kraken, the large, multi-tentacled boss at the end of the chapter. In addition to weapons scattered throughout the ship, players can access schematics to build powerful offensive and defensive weapons, including 4 variations of the Venom X from the previous chapter. Players can also find intel to learn more about the story of Extinction.

The fourth map, "Awakening", was released as part of the Invasion DLC pack. The map takes place in an underground Cryptid hive, 36 hours after "Mayday", and introduces three new types of Cryptids: the flying Gargoyle, the explosive Bomber, and the powerful Mammoth. The Cryptids' masters, the Ancestors, are also seen in the map. The players have access to ARK attachments, which turn weapons into laser weapons, greatly increasing their power. As with the previous two maps, story intel can be found.

The final map, "Exodus", was released as part of the Nemesis DLC pack. The map takes place in a launch facility, 3 months after "Awakening", where the players are pit in a final battle against the forces of the Cryptids. Nearly every Cryptid type is encountered in the map, including the Ancestors. Players can choose their own paths in progressing throughout the map. The map also introduces two brand new weapons, the NX-1 Disruptor and the NX-1 Grenades, which are required to take out the Ancestors.

== Plot ==
=== Campaign ===
Sometime before the events of the game, a conflict in the Middle East devastated the region, destroying several oil fields that resulted in a global energy crisis. Many oil-producing countries in South America formed the Federation of the Americas, a military dictatorship, which then annexed all its remaining countries in the continent before invading Central America, the Caribbean, and Mexico.

In 2018, U.S. Army Captain Elias Walker (Stephen Lang) tells his teenage sons Logan and David "Hesh" Walker (Brandon Routh) about the legend of the Ghosts, a coalition of all U.S. Special Operations Forces units, and how they first appeared during the conflict in the Middle East. Meanwhile, in space, the Federation hijacks the Orbital Defense Initiative (ODIN), an American network of space weapon satellites using kinetic bombardment, which the Federation uses to destroy cities in the southwestern United States. U.S. Air Force astronauts Captain Baker and Mosley sacrifice themselves to destroy the space station and stop ODIN from launching more payloads into the U.S., and the Walker family narrowly escapes the destruction of San Diego.

Ten years later, the war between the United States and the Federation was fought to a bloody stalemate along the destroyed cities and the former United States-Mexico border, called "No Man's Land", turning into a war of attrition as Federation forces tried to break the frontlines, with the U.S. holding its ground. In 2028, Hesh and Logan enlisted in a special Army unit under Elias, with Riley, their loyal German Shepherd. During a mission into No Man's Land, they see Federation agent Gabriel Rorke (Kevin Gage) interrogating a Ghost operative named Ajax. They meet and join fellow Ghost operatives Thomas Merrick (Jeffrey Pierce) and Keegan Russ (Brian Bloom) to rescue Ajax, but he is killed. The brothers return to Santa Monica, California, where U.S. forces hold out against a Federation assault and reunite with their father, who reveals himself as the leader of the Ghosts. Recruiting his sons into the Ghosts, Elias tells them about Rorke and how he began hunting the Ghosts.

In 2016, during the Federation's initial expansion in South America, General Diego Almagro ordered all U.S.-born citizens in Federation territory to be imprisoned or executed. Rorke convinced the U.S. government to send the Ghosts to assassinate Almagro in Caracas. They succeeded, but Elias was forced to abandon Rorke to save himself and his squad. The Federation captured Rorke and brainwashed him with torture and hallucinogens into becoming a Federation commander.

In the present, the Ghosts infiltrate Caracas to interrogate Rorke's location from Victor Ramos, the head of the Federation's R&D. They attack and capture Rorke from his base in the Gulf of Mexico, but Federation forces rescue him after destroying their plane. Landing in the Yucatán Peninsula, the team witnesses a Federation missile launch. To determine its trajectory, they infiltrate a Federation base in the Andes and learn of plans for a new superweapon. Constructing a counterattack, the Ghosts destroy the Atlas oil platform in the Drake Passage and sink a destroyer guarding a factory in Rio de Janeiro. The team then breaks into the factory, finding that the Federation has reverse-engineered ODIN into LOKI, their own orbital bombardment system.

After destroying the factory, the Ghosts regroup at a safe house in Las Vegas but are captured by Rorke, who executes Elias before they escape Federation forces. In a last-ditch effort, the U.S. military pools all its remaining forces on an all-out assault against the LOKI space station. Hesh and Logan launch a missile at the Federation space center in the Atacama Desert, and U.S. forces take over the Federation space station, seizing LOKI and destroying the Federation military by turning their weapons on them. Hesh and Logan then disobey Merrick's orders and pursue Rorke to avenge their father. The brothers corner Rorke, and Logan shoots Rorke, seemingly killing him, before rescuing Hesh from drowning and reaching the surface on the beach. However, Rorke survives the shot by Logan before capturing Logan, aiming to brainwash him into becoming a Federation agent.

In a post-credits scene, Logan is seen inside a caged pit in the jungle, presumably going through the same torture methods as Rorke.

=== Extinction ===
Following the Federation's attack on ODIN Station and the strike that decimated a large portion of the United States, a stray missile hit Caldera Peak, Colorado, revealing a colony of ancient creatures called Cryptids lying dormant below it. The Cryptids' masters, the Ancestors, seized the opportunity by commanding them to awake, massacre the town, and destroy everything in their path. To contain the outbreak, a Task Force, code-named Spectre, was sent in to exterminate the Cryptids' presence. Though they were successful, remains of the Cryptids were collected by the Nightfall Program, a research program dedicated to uncovering the origins of the creatures. David Archer (Dave B. Mitchell), a former British SAS Captain who started the program, launched covert operations to breed Cryptids for experimentation, as well as deciphering of glyphs found within several sites where Nightfall was researching on Cryptid appearance. However, one of the researchers working at Nightfall, Dr. Samantha Cross (Ali Hillis), began to fall under the Ancestors' influence, and slowly became one of their hypnotic spies, capable of telepathic abilities. She caused an outbreak at the Nightfall facility, killing all members within it, except herself and Archer. An elite squad named CIF Team One was dispatched to help Archer and Cross escape, but Archer secretly snuck away on a destroyer vessel supplied by one of his mysterious contacts, in order to arrive at another Cryptid site.

For the following three weeks, Archer would experiment on Cross in order to learn of her abilities, realizing that she is capable of taming the Cryptids. Using her as a beacon, Archer guided the destroyer toward the remaining Cryptid Arks around the world. Cross fell into the Ancestors' control even more, and upon full possession, she began to summon the Ark's guardian, the Kraken, to protect the Cryptid colony and kill Archer and everyone aboard the destroyer. CIF Team One was sent in once again to rescue Archer, as well as eliminate Cross, per the deal between Archer and CIF Team One's handler, General "Godfather" Castle. However, Cross evaded their attempts to kill her and wound up in the Cryptid Ark. Archer and his men later arrived at the island where the Ark is located, however they encounter hordes of Cryptids, leading to Archer's hand being infected. Cross arrived and amputated his hand, then forged a temporary alliance with him, as she attempted to explain the Ancestors' true motives, and her reasons for not siding with them. CIF Team One was later dispatched by Castle to find Archer as well as retrieve the Cortex, a device containing tissue samples of an Ancestor's brain. The team succeeded in finding the Cortex, and Cross was extracted from the Ark, while Archer was left to die.

While on their way back to the United States, CIF Team One was attacked by Cryptid forces, and was stranded in the heart of the outbreak, while Cross escaped captivity. For the next three months, Cryptids would begin to overrun all military centers of the US, leaving General Castle as the leader of the surviving remnants of the country. He came in contact with CIF Team One, and ordered them to protect the Exodus launch site, allowing the remnants to escape Earth into outer space, away from the Cryptids' influence. In the midst of the operation, Cross regained contact with the survivors, reasoning CIF Team One must sacrifice themselves to activate the Medusa, a psionic weapon capable of eradicating all Cryptids within a three-mile radius, and give mankind a chance to overcome extinction. In a final order, General Castle commanded his men to defeat the oncoming Cryptid siege led by the Ancestors themselves. Now in safe passage to the space station, Cross acknowledged that her otherworldly powers were key in humanity's future retaliation, agreeing to be placed in a replica Beacon Amplifier to harness her gifts to benefit the future descendants of the Exodus program.

== Development ==
On February 7, 2013, Activision confirmed that a new Call of Duty game was in development and would be released Q4 2013. The publisher expected to sell fewer copies than the series' previous entry, Call of Duty: Black Ops II, on seventh-generation consoles (PlayStation 3 and Xbox 360) due to the transition to next-generation consoles.

The series starts a new subseries with Ghosts to coincide with Sony and Microsoft's eighth generation consoles entering the market. The game was supposed to debut an engine built by the developer, originally described as a new engine, but later clarified to be the same engine as used in previous games with "significant" upgrades. The game also utilized Umbra Software's rendering tool, Umbra 3, as a way to speed up the rendering process of large environments by an optimization known as occlusion culling – a method of filtering out hidden objects so they are not rendered.

Infinity Ward prioritized frame rate over display resolution during the development of Call of Duty: Ghosts, with the game targeted to run at 60 frames per second on each platform. While the game outputs at 1080p on PlayStation 4, the Xbox One can only manage 720p while maintaining the frame rate. Due to a "configuration issue" however, the PlayStation 4 version still required a release day patch to reach 1080p. The Wii U version of the game was developed by Treyarch.

David Buckley scored the game's original soundtrack.

== Marketing and release ==
=== Reveal ===
On April 29, 2013, the official Call of Duty website was updated with a social media mosaic that filled up every time a user logged into the site via Twitter or Facebook. The next day, the mosaic was completed and the picture showed a skull along the text "the Ghosts are real." Some details about Ghosts leaked prior, especially when Tesco pulled the listing of the game for the PlayStation 3 after it was put up accidentally. Several other retailers, including Target, listed it for PlayStation 3 and Xbox 360. The live-action teaser trailer for Ghosts, titled "Masked Warriors", features glimpses of people wearing historical battle masks, among them one of a group of soldiers putting on the skull mask shown on the box art. It was released on May 1, 2013. Ghosts appeared at the "Xbox Reveal" event on May 21, 2013. During E3 2013 the PlayStation 4 and Xbox One versions were promoted, and the Wii U version was confirmed towards the end of the event on June 13. Ghosts was the last Call of Duty game to be released on a Nintendo system until Call of Duty: Modern Warfare 4 on the Nintendo Switch 2 in 2026.

On August 14, 2013, American rapper Eminem's "Survival" featuring Liz Rodrigues, with production by DJ Khalil was premiered in the multiplayer trailer for the game. The music video for the song features various footage from the game's single player campaign, and other elements from the game.

=== Release ===
Call of Duty: Ghosts was released for Windows, PlayStation 3, Wii U, and Xbox 360 on November 5, 2013. Activision announced that the game would be available for the PlayStation 4 and Xbox One in time for each console's release date on November 15, 2013, and November 22, 2013, respectively. Despite the official announcement for next-generation systems, the PlayStation 4 version of the game was made available by some retailers ahead of the scheduled release date.

=== Downloadable content ===
Several waves of downloadable content (DLC) were released for Ghosts. Pre-ordered versions of the game included a bonus "dynamic" map called "Free Fall" and also got Simon "Ghost" Riley and John "Soap" MacTavish from Modern Warfare 2 as playable multiplayer characters. However, "Free Fall" was excluded from the Wii U pre-ordered version; it was later released for the system on March 4, 2014.

Four sets of DLC map packs were released in 2014. A Season Pass is available, which gives players immediate access to all four DLC packs.

The first map pack, Onslaught, was released for the Xbox 360 and Xbox One on January 28, 2014, and for PlayStation 3, PlayStation 4, and Windows on February 27. It contains an exclusive playlist for owners of the DLC. The DLC pack brings in 4 new multiplayer maps: "Fog", "Bayview", "Ignition", and "Containment". The map Ignition is a remake of Scrapyard from Modern Warfare 2. It also includes two new multiplayer weapons: the Maverick assault rifle, and the Maverick A-2 sniper rifle; as well as "Nightfall", the first of the four Extinction episodic contents. On the multiplayer map Fog, Michael Myers from the Halloween film series appears as a playable character, obtainable by earning a care package by completing various challenges via Field Orders.

The second map pack, Devastation, was released on the Xbox 360 and Xbox One on April 3, 2014, and on PlayStation 3, PlayStation 4, and Windows on May 8. It contains an exclusive playlist for owners of the DLC. The pack introduces four new multiplayer maps: "Ruins", "Behemoth", "Collision", and "Unearthed". The map Unearthed is a remake of the fan-favorite map Dome from Modern Warfare 3. It includes a new hybrid multiplayer weapon called the Ripper, which Season Pass owners received early. On the map "Ruins", Predator from the Predator film series appears as a playable character. Additionally, it includes the next installment in the Extinction episodic contents, titled "Mayday".

The third map pack, Invasion, was released on the Xbox 360 and Xbox One on June 3, 2014, and on PlayStation 3, PlayStation 4, and Windows on July 3. It contains an exclusive playlist for owners of the DLC. The pack introduces four new multiplayer maps: "Pharaoh", "Departed", "Mutiny", and "Favela", a remake of the fan-favorite map of the same name from Modern Warfare 2. It includes the third Extinction episodic content, titled "Awakening".

The final map pack, Nemesis, was released on the Xbox 360 and Xbox One on August 5, 2014, and on PlayStation 3, PlayStation 4, and Windows on September 4. It contains an exclusive playlist for owners of the DLC. The pack introduces four new multiplayer maps: "Goldrush", "Subzero", "Dynasty", and a reimagined version of the map "Shipment" from Call of Duty 4: Modern Warfare, "Showtime". It includes the final Extinction episode, titled "Exodus".

Additional downloadable content includes Announcer Packs of Snoop Dogg and the Drill Instructor featuring R. Lee Ermey (who starred in Full Metal Jacket), Personalization Packs, Legend Packs and Special Characters.

== Reception ==
Reception

Aggregate score
Aggregator	Score
Metacritic	(PS4) 78/100 (XONE) 78/100 (X360) 73/100 (PS3) 71/100 (WiiU) 69/100 (PC) 68/100

Review scores
Publication	Score
Computer and Video Games	7/10
Destructoid	5/10
Edge	7/10
Electronic Gaming Monthly	7.5/10
Eurogamer	7/10
Game Informer	8/10
GameSpot	8/10
GamesRadar+	4/5
GameTrailers	7.0/10
GameZone	7.5/10
Giant Bomb	3/5
IGN	8.8/10
Joystiq	3.5/5
PlayStation Official Magazine – UK	8/10
Official Xbox Magazine (UK)	8/10
Official Xbox Magazine (US)	8/10
Polygon	6.5/10
VideoGamer.com	7/10
Digital Spy	4/5
Metro (UK)	8/10
Mirror.co.uk	4/5
NowGamer	7.5/10
PlayStation LifeStyle	8.0/10

=== Critical response ===
Call of Duty: Ghosts received both "mixed or average" and "generally favorable" reviews, according to review aggregator website Metacritic. IGN praised the game for introducing "sweeping changes that breathe new life into the multiplayer experience" and called the campaign "lengthy, challenging, and varied". GameSpot went even further regarding the campaign, calling it "impressive" and "a terrific collection of shootouts and set pieces". Both also welcomed the new character customization feature and game types in multiplayer, particularly Extinction which was called "tremendous fun" and "an interesting strategic dynamic".

Conversely, PC Gamer dubbed the campaign as "exciting but only passively entertaining" and criticized the "whack-a-mole" feel in the game's multiplayer. VideoGamer.com praised overall gameplay, saying it "seems more refined and enjoyable than Black Ops 2" but criticized the campaign calling it a "po-faced, nonsensical rehash of greatest hits long past". Eurogamer was less critical of the campaign, commenting that "the Ghosts campaign can't help but feel like a step backwards", but that "it's still capable of being devilishly entertaining" and "moment-to-moment thrills are still there, if muted by expectation". Joystiq disparaged both types of gameplay, saying "It layers a fresh coat of paint over a tired design document; a document that brings players down a rote campaign path before landing them in a multiplayer mode that abandons many of the creative advancements seen in Black Ops 2".

=== Sales ===
Despite shipping $1 billion worth of units to retail channels within 24 hours of the game's launch, overall sales were down compared to 2012's Call of Duty: Black Ops II. Activision blamed the fall in demand on uncertainty caused by the upcoming transition to eighth generation consoles. As of February 2014, the game had sold over 19 million copies in physical retail.

=== Retrospective reception ===
Retrospective assessments of Call of Duty: Ghosts have been mostly negative; it has placed low in lists ranking the series' games. Critics have criticized the game as lacking innovation and offering little to differentiate it from previous titles. Seth Parmer of TheGamer described the game as "underwhelming", writing that Ghosts failed to capture the magic of Infinity Ward's previous games. The campaign's story received criticism for being unmemorable and poorly executed, as well as its unresolved cliffhanger ending. The staff of NME described the multiplayer as "underwhelming", while others believed the maps were some of the worst in the series. The game's color palette was also considered bleak and ugly. Parmer believed that the Extinction mode failed to match the standards set by Treyarch's Zombies mode. Complex's Dan Wenerowicz argued that Ghosts represented the end of the series' "Golden Age". Nevertheless, Chris Freiberg of Den of Geek responded more positively to Ghosts, praising the campaign as one of the series' best and "in hindsight it made a lot of daring changes that have actually aged pretty well". Ghosts was also the first Call of Duty game to feature sliding, leaning, and animations when interacting with the environment.
