= List of Activision games: 2020–present =

Title	Platform(s)	Release date	Developer(s)	Ref.
Call of Duty: Warzone	Microsoft Windows	March 10, 2020	Infinity Ward / Raven Software	
Call of Duty: Warzone	PlayStation 4	March 10, 2020	Infinity Ward / Raven Software	
Call of Duty: Warzone	Xbox One	March 10, 2020	Infinity Ward / Raven Software	
Call of Duty: Modern Warfare 2 - Campaign Remastered	PlayStation 4	March 31, 2020	Beenox	
Call of Duty: Modern Warfare 2 - Campaign Remastered	Microsoft Windows	April 30, 2020	Beenox	
Call of Duty: Modern Warfare 2 - Campaign Remastered	Xbox One	April 30, 2020	Beenox	
Tony Hawk's Pro Skater 1 + 2	Microsoft Windows	September 4, 2020	Vicarious Visions	
Tony Hawk's Pro Skater 1 + 2	PlayStation 4	September 4, 2020	Vicarious Visions	
Tony Hawk's Pro Skater 1 + 2	Xbox One	September 4, 2020	Vicarious Visions	
Crash Bandicoot 4: It's About Time	PlayStation 4	October 2, 2020	Toys for Bob	
Crash Bandicoot 4: It's About Time	Xbox One	October 2, 2020	Toys for Bob	
Sekiro: Shadows Die Twice	Stadia	October 28, 2020	FromSoftware	
Call of Duty: Black Ops Cold War	Microsoft Windows	November 13, 2020	Treyarch / Raven Software	
Call of Duty: Black Ops Cold War	PlayStation 4	November 13, 2020	Treyarch / Raven Software	
Call of Duty: Black Ops Cold War	PlayStation 5	November 13, 2020	Treyarch / Raven Software	
Call of Duty: Black Ops Cold War	Xbox One	November 13, 2020	Treyarch / Raven Software	
Call of Duty: Black Ops Cold War	Xbox Series X/S	November 13, 2020	Treyarch / Raven Software	
Crash Bandicoot 4: It's About Time	Nintendo Switch	March 12, 2021	Toys for Bob	
Crash Bandicoot 4: It's About Time	PlayStation 5	March 12, 2021	Toys for Bob	
Crash Bandicoot 4: It's About Time	Xbox Series X/S	March 12, 2021	Toys for Bob	
Crash Bandicoot 4: It's About Time	Microsoft Windows	March 26, 2021	Toys for Bob	
Tony Hawk's Pro Skater 1 + 2	PlayStation 5	March 26, 2021	Vicarious Visions	
Tony Hawk's Pro Skater 1 + 2	Xbox Series X/S	March 26, 2021	Vicarious Visions	
Tony Hawk's Pro Skater 1 + 2	Nintendo Switch	June 25, 2021	Vicarious Visions	
Call of Duty: Vanguard	Microsoft Windows	November 5, 2021	Sledgehammer Games	
Call of Duty: Vanguard	PlayStation 4	November 5, 2021	Sledgehammer Games	
Call of Duty: Vanguard	PlayStation 5	November 5, 2021	Sledgehammer Games	
Call of Duty: Vanguard	Xbox One	November 5, 2021	Sledgehammer Games	
Call of Duty: Vanguard	Xbox Series X/S	November 5, 2021	Sledgehammer Games	
Call of Duty: Modern Warfare II	Microsoft Windows	October 28, 2022	Infinity Ward	
Call of Duty: Modern Warfare II	PlayStation 4	October 28, 2022	Infinity Ward	
Call of Duty: Modern Warfare II	PlayStation 5	October 28, 2022	Infinity Ward	
Call of Duty: Modern Warfare II	Xbox One	October 28, 2022	Infinity Ward	
Call of Duty: Modern Warfare II	Xbox Series X/S	October 28, 2022	Infinity Ward	
Call of Duty: Warzone 2.0	Microsoft Windows	November 16, 2022	Infinity Ward / Raven Software	
Call of Duty: Warzone 2.0	PlayStation 4	November 16, 2022	Infinity Ward / Raven Software	
Call of Duty: Warzone 2.0	PlayStation 5	November 16, 2022	Infinity Ward / Raven Software	
Call of Duty: Warzone 2.0	Xbox One	November 16, 2022	Infinity Ward / Raven Software	
Call of Duty: Warzone 2.0	Xbox Series X/S	November 16, 2022	Infinity Ward / Raven Software	
Crash Team Rumble	PlayStation 4	June 20, 2023	Toys for Bob	
Crash Team Rumble	PlayStation 5	June 20, 2023	Toys for Bob	
Crash Team Rumble	Xbox One	June 20, 2023	Toys for Bob	
Crash Team Rumble	Xbox Series X/S	June 20, 2023	Toys for Bob	
Call of Duty: Modern Warfare III	Microsoft Windows	November 10, 2023	Sledgehammer Games	
Call of Duty: Modern Warfare III	PlayStation 4	November 10, 2023	Sledgehammer Games	
Call of Duty: Modern Warfare III	PlayStation 5	November 10, 2023	Sledgehammer Games	
Call of Duty: Modern Warfare III	Xbox One	November 10, 2023	Sledgehammer Games	
Call of Duty: Modern Warfare III	Xbox Series X/S	November 10, 2023	Sledgehammer Games	
Call of Duty: Warzone Mobile	Android	March 21, 2024	Digital Legends Entertainment, Beenox, Activision Shanghai Studio, Solid State Studios	
Call of Duty: Warzone Mobile	iOS	March 21, 2024	Digital Legends Entertainment, Beenox, Activision Shanghai Studio, Solid State Studios	
Call of Duty: Black Ops 6	Microsoft Windows	October 25, 2024	Treyarch / Raven Software	
Call of Duty: Black Ops 6	PlayStation 4	October 25, 2024	Treyarch / Raven Software	
Call of Duty: Black Ops 6	PlayStation 5	October 25, 2024	Treyarch / Raven Software	
Call of Duty: Black Ops 6	Xbox One	October 25, 2024	Treyarch / Raven Software	
Call of Duty: Black Ops 6	Xbox Series X/S	October 25, 2024	Treyarch / Raven Software	
Tony Hawk's Pro Skater 3 + 4	Microsoft Windows	July 11, 2025	Iron Galaxy	
Tony Hawk's Pro Skater 3 + 4	Nintendo Switch	July 11, 2025	Iron Galaxy	
Tony Hawk's Pro Skater 3 + 4	Nintendo Switch 2	July 11, 2025	Iron Galaxy	
Tony Hawk's Pro Skater 3 + 4	PlayStation 4	July 11, 2025	Iron Galaxy	
Tony Hawk's Pro Skater 3 + 4	PlayStation 5	July 11, 2025	Iron Galaxy	
Tony Hawk's Pro Skater 3 + 4	Xbox One	July 11, 2025	Iron Galaxy	
Tony Hawk's Pro Skater 3 + 4	Xbox Series X/S	July 11, 2025	Iron Galaxy	
Call of Duty: Black Ops 7	Microsoft Windows	November 14, 2025	Treyarch / Raven Software	
Call of Duty: Black Ops 7	PlayStation 4	November 14, 2025	Treyarch / Raven Software	
Call of Duty: Black Ops 7	PlayStation 5	November 14, 2025	Treyarch / Raven Software	
Call of Duty: Black Ops 7	Xbox One	November 14, 2025	Treyarch / Raven Software	
Call of Duty: Black Ops 7	Xbox Series X/S	November 14, 2025	Treyarch / Raven Software	
Call of Duty: Modern Warfare 4	Microsoft Windows	October 23, 2026	Infinity Ward	
Call of Duty: Modern Warfare 4	Nintendo Switch 2	October 23, 2026	Infinity Ward	
Call of Duty: Modern Warfare 4	PlayStation 5	October 23, 2026	Infinity Ward	
Call of Duty: Modern Warfare 4	Xbox Series X/S	October 23, 2026	Infinity Ward	
Spyro: A Realm Beyond	Microsoft Windows	2027	Toys for Bob	
Spyro: A Realm Beyond	Nintendo Switch 2	2027	Toys for Bob	
Spyro: A Realm Beyond	PlayStation 5	2027	Toys for Bob	
Spyro: A Realm Beyond	Xbox Series X/S	2027	Toys for Bob	
