= Call of Duty: Warzone =

Call of Duty: Warzone may refer to:

- Call of Duty: Warzone (2020 video game), the original version of Call of Duty: Warzone
- Call of Duty: Warzone (2022 video game), the second version of Call of Duty: Warzone, previously known as Call of Duty: Warzone 2.0
