= Empire of Silence =

Empire of Silence may refer to:

- a 1947 book by Belgian author Oscar-Paul Gilbert, originally published under the French title L'Empire du silence : Congo 1946
- a 2018 novel by author Christopher Ruocchio, first instalment of The Sun Eater series
- a 2022 documentary film by Belgian director Thierry Michel
