= Samuel Roukin =

English actor (born 1980)

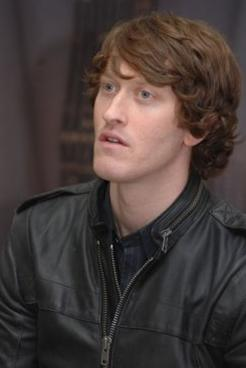
- Roukin in 2008
- Born: Samuel Roukin; 15 August 1980 (age 46); Southport, Merseyside, England
- Occupation: Actor
- Years active: 2008-present

Samuel Roukin (ROO-kin; born 15 August 1980) is an English actor, writer and DJ. He is best known for his role as John Graves Simcoe in the series, Turn: Washington's Spies and Simon "Ghost" Riley in Call of Duty: Modern Warfare II, Call of Duty: Modern Warfare III, and Call of Duty: Modern Warfare 4.

== Early life and education ==
Roukin was born in Southport, England, and currently lives in Los Angeles. He displayed an interest in drama from an early age. He completed secondary school at Merchant Taylors' School, Crosby where he was involved in many school productions. He goes back to the school to give acting workshops to pupils involved in drama and English. Roukin went on to train at the Bristol Old Vic Theatre School, graduating in 2003.

In a 2016 interview, Roukin disclosed that he is both a husband and father.

== Career ==
Roukin starred in the 2008 film Happy-Go-Lucky as the love interest of the main character, Poppy (played by Sally Hawkins).

ITV's two-part drama pilot for the television series DCI Banks had Roukin portraying one half of a serial killing couple.

Roukin later portrayed a detective in the ITV1 Drama Appropriate Adult, a two-part dramatization exploring the aftermath of the capture of serial killers Fred West and Rosemary West.

He played Bagot in Richard II, part of the cultural Olympiad of Shakespeare, directed by Rupert Goold and produced by Sam Mendes for BBC2 and NBC.

Roukin also portrayed British Lieutenant-Colonel John Graves Simcoe, one of the main antagonists of the 2014 AMC series Turn: Washington's Spies, a period drama about American Revolutionary War spies.

In 2022, Roukin revealed on Twitter that he would play the role of Simon "Ghost" Riley in Call of Duty: Modern Warfare II, replacing Jeff Leach, and did so again in Call of Duty: Modern Warfare III.

== Filmography ==
=== Film ===
| Year | Title | Role | Note |
|---|---|---|---|
| 2008 | Love You More | Teacher | Short film |
| 2008 | The End | John | Short film |
| 2008 | Solomon Kane | Marcus Kane | |
| 2008 | Happy-Go-Lucky | Tim | |
| 2009 | Bright Star | John Reynolds | |
| 2010 | Harry Potter and the Deathly Hallows – Part 1 | Snatcher | |
| 2011 | The Decoy Bride | 2nd Paparazzi | |
| 2016 | Equity | Ed | |
| 2020 | A Call to Spy | Christopher | |
| TBA | Gettysburg 1863 | Lieutenant Kelly | Filming |

=== Stage ===
| Year | Title | Role | Note |
|---|---|---|---|
| 2009 | Seven Jewish Children | | |
| 2010 | The Lieutenant of Inishmore | Mad Padraic | |

=== Television ===
| Year | Title | Role | Note |
|---|---|---|---|
| 2008 | Housewife, 49 | Michael Hockey | Television film |
| 2008 | Miss Austen Regrets | Harris Bigg | Television film |
| 2010 | DCI Banks | Marcus Payne | 2 episodes |
| 2011 | Appropriate Adult | Detective Constable Darren Law | Television film |
| 2012 | Richard II | Bagot | Television film |
| 2014–2017 | Turn: Washington's Spies | John Graves Simcoe | 36 episodes |
| 2016 | Salem | Beelzebub | 8 episodes |
| 2017 | The Magicians | Fairy Ambassador | 2 episodes |
| 2017 | The Librarians | Darrington Dare | Episode: “And the Bleeding Crown” |
| 2018 | Agents of S.H.I.E.L.D. | Faulnak | 2 episodes |
| 2019 | Counterpart | Yanek (young) | Episode: “Twin Cities” |
| 2022 | Pantheon | Gabe (voice) | 2 episodes |

=== Video games ===
| Year | Title | Role | Note |
|---|---|---|---|
| 2022 | Call of Duty: Modern Warfare II | Lt. Simon "Ghost" Riley | |
| 2023 | Call of Duty: Modern Warfare III | Lt. Simon "Ghost" Riley | |
| 2026 | Call of Duty: Modern Warfare 4 | Lt. Simon "Ghost" Riley | |

== Audiobook narration ==
- The Sun Eater series by Christopher Ruocchio
- The Adventures of Sherlock Holmes by Arthur Conan Doyle
- The Other Wind by Ursula K. Le Guin
- Infinity Blade: Awakening and Infinity Blade: Redemption by Brandon Sanderson
- DS Liam Kilshaw series by Matt Brolly
- Witchmark by C.L. Polk
