= Call of Duty: Modern Warfare 4 =

- Standard edition cover
- Developer: Infinity Ward (Note: Nintendo Switch 2 version developed by Digital Legends Entertainment. PC version developed by Beenox. Ranked Play mode developed in collaboration with Treyarch. Additional development work by Sledgehammer Games, Raven Software, Demonware, High Moon Studios, Activision Shanghai and Activision Central Tech.)
- Publisher: Activision
- Director: Chris Schmidt
- Artists: Joel Emslie; Haine Kim
- Writers: Justin Harris; Brian Bloom; Eric Anderson; Shelby Carleton; Heather Woodward
- Composers: Stephen Barton; Jason Graves; (Note: Additional music for DMZ mode composed by Ross Lara.)
- Series: Call of Duty
- Engine: IW 9.0
- Platforms: Nintendo Switch 2; PlayStation 5; Windows; Xbox Series X/S
- Release: October 23, 2026 (Note: Those who digitally pre-order Modern Warfare 4 are able to play the game's campaign mode from October 16, 2026, and DMZ mode from October 20, 2026.)
- Genre: First-person shooter
- Modes: Single-player, multiplayer

Call of Duty: Modern Warfare 4 is a 2026 first-person shooter game developed by Infinity Ward and published by Activision. It is the twenty-third installment in the Call of Duty series and the fourth and final entry in the rebooted Modern Warfare sub-series, following Call of Duty: Modern Warfare III (2023). It was released on October 23, 2026, for Nintendo Switch 2, PlayStation 5, Windows, and Xbox Series X/S. Prior to release, Modern Warfare 4 received positive reviews from critics.

== Gameplay ==
Call of Duty: Modern Warfare 4 is a first-person shooter video game. It comprises three main game modes: a single-player campaign mode; a competitive multiplayer component; and the extraction shooter mode "DMZ", returning from Call of Duty: Modern Warfare II (2022). Modern Warfare 4's campaign primarily focuses on a war between North and South Korea; in addition, missions also take place in various locations such as New York, Paris, and Mumbai.

The multiplayer mode features 12 core 6v6 maps at launch, accompanied by returning game modes such as "Gunfight" with a dedicated map pool, and "Big War" featuring large-scale maps. A new map, "Kill Block", features dynamic layouts that constantly change as the match progresses, with over 500 different possible configurations. One of the major changes to the gameplay system is the removal of hipfire bloom, a mechanic that penalizes players by reducing accuracy of shots when firing their weapons from the hip. Updates to the movement system include the ability to hang and shimmy along edges and pipes.

In DMZ, 20 squads of up to three players deploy into a large-scale map, dubbed the "exclusion zone", where they scavenge for loot and complete objectives before attempting to exfiltrate. Players can pursue story missions, which are a set of narrative-focused tasks; Dynamic Operations, which are randomly-generated objectives that differ each match; or simply freely roam the map. While exploring, players can encounter and fight against hostile NPCs as well as other players. Killing other players results in the player's notoriety level increasing, marking their presence on the map for other players to find. A new feature in DMZ is the Forward Operating Base (FOB), an in-game hub where players prepare their gear before deployment, including setting up their loadouts, crafting items and interacting with vendors. Players can also gain permanent progression for their Operators via individual "trait trees", granting skills and bonuses that cater to specific play styles. Additionally, the playable map features dynamic weather effects, such as rain and snow, which intensify as the match progresses.

== Plot ==
=== Campaign ===
In October 2026, ROKMC Private First Class Park Hyun-Jun (Young Mazino) witnesses the city of Hajin (Note: A fictional South Korean region stated to be a tri-point border between North Korea, South Korea and Russia. The name is used for both the central city and the wider area.) being struck by an EMP attack, seconds before a full-scale invasion by the North Korean Army (NKA). (Note: Modeled after the Korean People's Army (KPA). The campaign never refers to the NKA as such. On multiplayer maps where the KPA would have a presence, they are called the North Korean Army (NKA).) His squad, "Sierra-1" – comprising Sergeant So Jae-Woo (Jae Kim), Private First Class Cho "Chow" Han (Joon Lee), Private First Class Yun Jong-Moon (Daniel J. Kim), and USMC Corporal Joseph Dunn (William Lipton) – reunite with their commanding officer, USMC First Lieutenant Reginald West (Luke Tennie), buy time for a withdrawal, and regroup with allied forces outside the city.

Five days prior, Captain John Price (Barry Sloane), on the run after assassinating US General Herschel Shepherd, (Note: As depicted in Call of Duty: Modern Warfare III (2023)) is contacted by his former CIA handler, Kate Laswell (Rya Kihlstedt). Laswell reveals that Russia recently moved to occupy parts of the Middle East after the US withdrew its forces – a move made possible by the Russian Defense Minister in charge of the Konni Ultranationalist PMC, known only as "the Archer" (Mads Mikkelsen). Price tracks Konni's financier, Milena Romanova (Tina Ivlev), to a nightclub in New York City and discovers Konni commander Vladimir Makarov (Julian Kostov) acquiring a package from her. Price kills Romanova and pursues Makarov across downtown Manhattan, where Makarov claims that war is coming and Price cannot stop it. After beating Makarov to death, Price is captured by members of the Las Almas Cartel, who reveal their leader, Valeria Garza (María Elisa Camargo), was supposed to help deliver the package to the Archer. As neither side likes the Archer, Valeria cuts a deal with Price, using the delivery of the package to get to the Archer; the latter agrees but elects not to inform Laswell.

The next day, while traveling to Paris, Price and Valeria are ambushed by Phillip Graves (Warren Kole) and the Shadow Company PMC, who attempt to retrieve the package, containing a DIA-developed weapon used in Venezuela, for the US government. Price kills Graves, and the following day, he and Valeria escape the French mafia and local police forces in a destructive chase through Paris; Laswell discovers Price's involvement and warns him to stop, but he refuses. Meanwhile, in North Korea, Ri Seung-Ho (Jeongmin Cho) succeeds his late father as the country's new Supreme Leader. His sister, NKA commander Ri Ju-Young (Prisca Kim), leads a raid on a village to execute a defector, aided by her right-hand man, Lieutenant Ko Jin-Hyuk (Lanny Joon). The defector is found and hanged, though he warns Ko that Ju-Young has ulterior motives. Ju-Young, Ko, and Seung-Ho later meet with the Archer, who offers Russia's support if North Korea invades the South; Seung-Ho is hesitant, having grown weary of the hostilities, while Ju-Young supports it.

Two days before the invasion, British SAS forces, led by Lieutenant Simon "Ghost" Riley (Samuel Roukin) and Captain Kyle "Gaz" Garrick (Elliot Knight), ambush the Cartel in Mumbai, where the deal with the Archer is to take place. To escape, Valeria uses the package, revealed to be a single-use directional EMP device, causing a contained blackout in the city. Ghost and Gaz confront Price, but the Cartel captures them. The Archer arrives, and Valeria pretends to restrain and present Price as part of the deal in exchange for her payment. Anticipating her betrayal, the Archer kills Valeria and the Cartel and captures Price, Ghost, and Gaz. The following day, Ju-Young launches a military coup with the Archer's help, executes Seung-Ho and his senior council, and assumes the mantle of Supreme Leader, intending to proceed with the invasion using the DIA weapon.

In the present day, US and South Korean forces make plans to launch a counterattack to retake Hajin before a retaliatory invasion of North Korea. Sierra-1 is deployed to assist ROKA SWC operative Captain Kwon "Kal" Hae-Soo (Joseph Lee) in covert operations against North Korean positions, but are stranded when their plane is shot down over North Korean territory, resulting in Chow being fatally wounded. Ko approaches Kal and Park, wanting to defect after witnessing Ju-Young's atrocities, steals one of the DIA weapons, and assists Sierra-1 in escaping to friendly territory. Meanwhile, in a secure NKA facility, Gaz angrily calls out Price for his actions before the Archer reveals that he intends to scapegoat Task Force 141 for Seung-Ho's assassination and executes him. Price frees himself and helps Ghost escape. The Archer recaptures Price, revealing that he is Makarov's father and that he intends to leave Price alive to watch the Ultranationalists' success over his allies.

After South Korean forces secure key locations in Hajin, including a nuclear power plant, Laswell orders Kal and Sierra-1, with Ko and Ghost's assistance, to assault the North Korean Presidential Palace, eliminate Ju-Young, and recover Price. Ko uses the DIA weapon to disable their defenses before the team manages to find Ju-Young and kill her, but Ghost splits from the team to locate Price on his own as the Presidential Palace is destroyed. Ko also elects to stay in North Korea to help rebuild the country.

While evacuating himself and Price back to Russia in a Konni convoy, the Archer admits to Price that the reignited Korean conflict was a means of testing the DIA weapon before Russia reverse-engineers it for use in a full-scale invasion of Europe. Ghost attacks the convoy shortly after, causing a car crash that results in Price being critically wounded. Price manages to escape and pursues the Archer on a frozen lake, where the Archer fatally wounds him and says they will die together before Price kills him. When Ghost wonders if Price's vigilantism was worth it, Price expresses regret for his actions and reconciles with Ghost before succumbing to his wounds. Ghost leaves with the remaining DIA weapons.

In a post-credits sequence, Laswell deletes the records of the Task Force 141 members and wipes her laptop clean with a USB killer. She greets her replacement, revealing plans to enter the Korean DMZ and welcoming the newcomer to the "Watcher Program".

=== DMZ ===
Despite the South Korean recapture of Hajin, NKA forces successfully sabotage the Haneul Nuclear Reactor, causing a meltdown which forces the city to be abandoned. Laswell's replacement, callsign "Watcher-2", sends an operator into the newly-formed Hajin DMZ to investigate a CIA drone that went offline in the area. The operator manages to discover a renewed NKA presence and recover crucial information, but is captured and executed by Blix (Rich Ting), an elite mercenary working for the NKA, who realizes the operator is not working for Ko. In response, Watcher-2 deploys new operators, with the support of Ghost and a guerrilla force led by Ko, to curtail the operations of NKA and rogue forces in the region.

Following several successful outings, the operators learn that the NKA are attempting to extract a nuclear warhead hidden within the Haneul Reactor. The operators are deployed to Haneul where they help Ghost extract the warhead and divert it from the mainland area before it explodes. Ghost narrowly escapes death, and later contacts Watcher-2, revealing activities taking place within the Russia-controlled Northern area of Hajin. Some time after, Ghost and the operators investigate "X01", a North Korean weapons development facility located in Northwest Hajin monitored by Blix and his organization, "100 Spirits". They learn that the facility was developing a bioweapon, its release controlled by an artificial intelligence modeled after Ju-Young. The operators retrieve the Ju-Young AI's source code, then venture into X01's Deep Vault where they neutralize the bioweapon and kill Blix when he attempts to stop them.

== Development ==
Development on Call of Duty: Modern Warfare 4 is led by Infinity Ward with assistance from 10 additional studios, including Treyarch, Sledgehammer Games and Raven Software.

Modern Warfare 4's setting on the Korean Peninsula with a renewed conflict between North and South Korea evokes the real world Korean War between the two states, which has been at an armistice since 1953 without an official conclusion. South Korean journalist Hyeonju Song said that "creating fiction based on it is bound to cause pain to someone" as "separated families who were torn apart by the war are still alive". Infinity Ward co-studio head Jack O'Hara said the studio worked to portray the region as respectfully as possible. They consulted regional specialists, defectors from North Korea and Infinity Ward's own Korean employees. Dialect coach June Yoon consulted on Korean dialectical differences between North Korea and South Korea and suggested edits to dialog to be more culturally appropriate. Infinity Ward were interested in the setting as they had not portrayed Asia at scale in a Modern Warfare game. Narrative director Jeff Negus said the studio wanted the narrative to feel "ripped from the headlines" such as the role played by American troops stationed in South Korea if North Korea were to attack its neighbor. On September 17, 2026, Mads Mikkelsen was revealed to be portraying the game's antagonist The Archer.

When explaining the changes made to the movement system in Modern Warfare 4, co-studio head Mark Grigsby said that the development team was motivated by player feedback to their previous title, Modern Warfare II (2022), where movement was perceived as being more restricted. The game does not employ the "Omnimovement" system featured in Treyarch's titles, Black Ops 6 (2024) and Black Ops 7 (2025), though Grigsby and O'Hara said Infinity Ward still aimed to make movement as fast and fluid as possible.

Modern Warfare 4 is the first Call of Duty game to only release on ninth generation consoles. Activision press material claimed that the game would set "a new technical benchmark for the series". The PC version's development was aided by Beenox, as with every Call of Duty title since Black Ops 4 (2018). The PC version features expanded ray tracing effects, including ray traced reflections, ambient occlusion and shadows, across all game modes. Modern Warfare 4 is the first Call of Duty title to ship on a Nintendo console since Call of Duty: Ghosts (2013) released on Wii U. The Nintendo Switch 2 version was developed by Digital Legends, who previously worked on Call of Duty: Warzone Mobile (2024). O'Hara said the process has been "pretty seamless" and they "got the game up and running pretty quickly" on the Switch 2. It supports cross-play and optional Joy-Con 2 mouse controls on the console.

Modern Warfare 4 was marketed as the final entry in the rebooted Modern Warfare sub-series, though according to Activision's chief marketing officer Tyler Bahl, the company does not rule out the possibility of bringing back certain characters of the subseries in future games.

Credits feature an "In Memoriam" portion dedicated to developers Reiner Yang, Matt Canale, and Preetam Raj Bordoloi, and Infinity Ward co-founder Vince Zampella, who all passed away during development.

== Release ==
Modern Warfare 4 was announced on May 28, 2026 and released on October 23, 2026 for Nintendo Switch 2, PlayStation 5, Windows, and Xbox Series X/S. Unlike previous Call of Duty titles Black Ops 6 and Black Ops 7, which launched on Xbox Game Pass on release day, Modern Warfare 4 is set to release on the subscription service at least a year after release day. Additionally, users who digitally pre-order Modern Warfare 4 were granted early access to the campaign mode, starting from October 16, 2026, as well as the DMZ mode starting from October 20, 2026.

Similar to previous Call of Duty titles, players who pre-order Modern Warfare 4 were granted early access to an open beta test for the game's multiplayer mode, which began August 21, 2026 and concluded on September 1, 2026; all players were granted access to the beta test from August 28, 2026. Unlike previous titles, Xbox Game Pass users were not granted early access to the open beta. For the first time in the franchise's history, in addition to multiplayer content, the Modern Warfare 4 beta also included a campaign mission titled "Entrenched" and a new "Resurgence" map for Call of Duty: Warzone (2022).

== Reception ==
Reception

Aggregate scores
Aggregator	Score
Metacritic	(PC) 85/100 (PS5) 83/100 (NS2) 85/100 (XSX) 87/100
OpenCritic	95% recommend

Modern Warfare 4 received "generally favorable" reviews on all platforms from critics, according to review aggregator website Metacritic.

=== Cutscene controversy ===
The opening montage sequence includes a clip of a paramedic performing CPR while other bodies lay in the streets of Itaewon, Seoul. The video was taken at the Seoul Halloween crowd crush which resulted in 160 deaths and 196 injuries. The video game was released one week before the fourth anniversary of the tragedy. Activision later apologized to the victims and said they would remove the offending scene in the next update.

== See also ==
- List of video games released in 2026
