= Call of Duty: Warzone Mobile =

2024 video game

- Developers: Activision Shanghai; Beenox; Digital Legends Entertainment; Solid State Studios
- Publisher: Activision
- Series: Call of Duty
- Engine: IW 9.0
- Platforms: Android; iOS
- Release: March 21, 2024; 2 years ago
- Genres: Battle royale, first-person shooter
- Mode: Multiplayer

Call of Duty: Warzone Mobile was a free-to-play first-person shooter game published by Activision. It was released on March 21, 2024 for iOS and Android as part of the Call of Duty video game series.

Warzone Mobile was designed to bring the Warzone experience to mobile platforms, featuring the same gameplay style as the original Warzone and its 2022 successor. Players could play in two primary modes: "Battle Royale" and "Resurgence", with varying lobby sizes and game mechanics. The game supported cross-progression with other Call of Duty titles but did not include cross-platform play with console and PC versions.

Development of Warzone Mobile, initially codenamed Project Aurora, began with its official announcement on March 10, 2022. The game underwent closed alpha testing starting in May 2022, and its name was officially revealed in September 2022. The limited launch version was first released in Australia in November 2022. Key aspects of development included the recruitment of multiple development studios and the integration of classic Call of Duty multiplayer modes and features.

Upon release, Warzone Mobile received generally positive reviews from critics. It launched with mixed reviews on Android but positive reviews on iOS. The game generated $1.4 million in consumer spending within 4 days of its launch.

On May 16, 2025, Activision announced that Warzone Mobile would no longer receive updates and would be pulled from the Apple App Store and Google Play on May 19, with microtransaction purchases no longer provided. The game's servers were later shut down on April 17, 2026.

== Gameplay ==
A screenshot of Call of Duty: Warzone Mobile, depicting gameplay from a match in the Battle Royale mode

Call of Duty: Warzone Mobile was a first-person shooter battle royale mobile game, which utilized the same gameplay style as the original Warzone and its 2022 successor. Warzone Mobile featured two primary game modes, "Battle Royale" and "Resurgence". Battle Royale hosted a maximum of 120 players per lobby, while Resurgence lobbies hosted 48 players maximum. Both game modes consisted of Solo, Duos, Trios, and Quads lobby types (corresponding to squad sizes of 1, 2, 3, and 4 players, respectively).

To survive, the player(s) had to gather supplies and weapons from other players or remain in the "safe zone" on an open area that continually closed due to an expanding toxic gas. The winner was the last individual or team standing. After being eliminated, a player was transferred to the "Gulag," where they had the opportunity to be redeployed if they won in a battle against another eliminated player. In Resurgence modes, the Gulag was absent; players respawned after a timer provided that there was at least one living teammate (or waited for a timer to run out before they could respawn if playing in Solo mode). Both the Gulag and Resurgence mechanics were available in-game until a predetermined point, at which players could no longer respawn without a teammate "buying" them back.

For the Modern Warfare III season 3 content update, Warzone Mobile reintroduced the Plunder game mode, which placed 84 players in a match where the primary objective was to collect the most in-game cash within 15 minutes. The first team to collect 2 million cash would put the match into overtime, where every cash amount gained had double the value. Unlike Battle Royale and Resurgence, Plunder allowed free respawns for players, as well as normal loadouts on spawn.

Warzone Mobile used cross-progression to synchronize its content with Call of Duty: Modern Warfare II, Call of Duty: Modern Warfare III, Call of Duty: Black Ops 6 and Warzone (2022) after the restricted release. It did not support cross-platform gaming with the Windows and console versions of Warzone.

The game also featured classic Call of Duty multiplayer modes, such as Domination, Kill Confirmed, Search & Destroy, and Team Deathmatch, on a selection of maps, including Shipment, Shoot House, and Scrapyard. It was a free-to-play title, with microtransactions syncing between it and the mainline Call of Duty games. Warzone Mobile also had controller support at launch.

== Development and release ==
On March 10, 2022, the development of Call of Duty: Warzone Mobile (codenamed Project Aurora) was first officially announced. The official Call of Duty website published via its blog and Activision via Twitter the preparation of bringing the Call of Duty: Warzone experience to mobile devices, as well as an invitation to join the development team. It was revealed on the Call of Duty blog that Digital Legends Entertainment, Beenox, Activision Shanghai Studio, and Solid State Studios are working on a mobile version of Call of Duty: Warzone.

On May 11, 2022, another publication announced the start of closed testing of the alpha version of Warzone Mobile. On September 8, 2022, during the GameSpot Swipe Mobile Showcase, Activision's Senior Vice President and Co-Head of Mobile Chris Plummer announced that Project Aurora would be released under the name Warzone Mobile. On September 15, 2022, during the Call of Duty Next event, Activision announced the upcoming release of Warzone Mobile, slated for a worldwide launch in 2023.

The private testing phase ended on November 1, 2022. A few days later, invites to an event in London were sent out to content producers who had previously worked on the game's early phases. The purpose of the meeting was for them to meet with the developers, exchange stories about the testing period, and try out a new version of the game. The Call of Duty: Warzone Mobile Global Summit took place in private on November 13 and 14, and attendees were not permitted to share any information about the event until November 21.

A pre-registration trailer was unveiled during the announcement. In November 2022, the limited launch version launched in Australia. In October 2023 the game got delayed to early 2024. The limited launch version was initially available in Australia, Chile, Norway, Sweden, Germany and Malaysia. On February 28, 2024, Activision announced that Call of Duty: Warzone Mobile would be released for iOS and Android worldwide on March 21, 2024.

On February 16, 2026, Activision announced that the servers of the Call of Duty Warzone mobile would go offline on April 17, 2026. The servers shut down as scheduled that day, rendering the game unplayable.

== Reception ==
Reception

Aggregate score
Aggregator	Score
Metacritic	(iOS) 76/100

Review scores
Publication	Score
IGN	8/10
TechRadar	4/5 stars

Call of Duty: Warzone Mobile received "generally favorable reviews", according to the review aggregator platform Metacritic. Christian Donlan, writing for Eurogamer, offered a positive perspective on Warzone Mobile. He noted the gameplay to be "fast-paced and enjoyable", maintaining the essence of Warzone on mobile platforms. Graphics were commended for their quality, with no reported visibility issues, even for older players. Regarding performance, Donlan acknowledged smooth operation on mobile devices, albeit with increased battery consumption and heat generation. Accessibility was highlighted as a positive aspect, with automated actions and customizable HUD elements catering to players of diverse skill levels. Overall, Donlan found the adaptation to the game quick and appreciated the tension in the Mobile Royale mode, while acknowledging the varied player base with both slower and faster players.

Marshall Honorof from Tom's Guide provided a positive review of Warzone Mobile. Honorof highlighted the effectiveness of the touchscreen controls during an Apple event demo, praising the game's intuitive mechanics and accessibility. Honorof recommended Warzone Mobile as a promising experience for players, offering a smooth transition between PC/console gaming and mobile platforms.

=== Criticisms ===
Following its launch, Call of Duty: Warzone Mobile faced backlash from players encountering various issues, leading to thousands of negative reviews flooding the Google Play Store. At one point, the game's rating plummeted to just 1.8 out of 5 stars on the Android platform. Some criticized the game for its server connectivity issues, inconsistent framerates, and numerous glitches. In contrast, Warzone Mobile enjoyed a much better reception on iOS, boasting a rating of 4.4 stars. The game performed more smoothly on iOS devices due to better optimization, despite still encountering some issues. While acknowledging its bugs and low-quality visuals, the majority of players on iOS still found enjoyment with the game.

=== Downloads and sales ===
By September 27, 2022, Warzone Mobile became the fastest pre-registered Activision Blizzard King mobile game on Google Play, reaching 15 million pre-registrations. It reached more than 50 million pre-registrations by February 28, 2024.

Within just four days of its global launch, Warzone Mobile surpassed $1.4 million in consumer spending, and garnered a lifetime revenue of $2.2 million. The US gaming market alone contributed 47% of the revenue with $1.1 million.
