= Beenox =

Canadian video game developer

Beenox Inc.
- Logo used since 2023
- Type: Subsidiary
- Industry: Video games
- Founded: May 2000; 26 years ago
- Founder: Dominique Brown
- Headquarters: Quebec City, Canada
- Number of locations: 2 (2024)
- Key people: Nour Polloni (studio head)
- Products: Spider-Man: Shattered Dimensions (2010); Crash Team Racing Nitro-Fueled (2019); Call of Duty series (2015–present)
- Number of employees: ~300
- Parent: Activision (2005–present)
- Divisions: Beenox Montreal
- Website: beenox.com

Beenox Inc. is a Canadian video game developer established in 2000 in Quebec City. The studio became a wholly owned subsidiary of Activision on May 25, 2005.

== History ==
Beenox was founded by Dominique Brown in May 2000 to develop games for Apple Computer's Mac. He recruited four colleagues from his former employer MegaToon. The studio's name was based on a random word he wrote in a notebook in chemistry class when brainstorming company names that contained an "X". It focused on game conversion to Mac in 2003, due to "cash flow problems". The company was acquired by Activision in May 2005.

In 2007, they returned to original game development with the console versions of Bee Movie Game, inspired by the feature film from DreamWorks Animation. As part of Activision's E3 2007 media blitz, it was announced that Beenox was the developer behind the Windows version of Activision's Spider-Man game Spider-Man: Friend or Foe, which was released in October 2007. They released the Xbox 360, PlayStation 2, PlayStation 3, Wii and Windows versions of Monsters vs. Aliens and the console versions of Guitar Hero Smash Hits. Beenox later developed the Spider-Man games Spider-Man: Shattered Dimensions, Spider-Man: Edge of Time, The Amazing Spider-Man, and The Amazing Spider-Man 2.

After founder Dominique Brown's departure in December 2012, the studio's focus shifted from leading original game development to doing a number of support tasks on Activision's superbrands Skylanders and Call of Duty. In 2015, Beenox worked in conjunction with Mercenary Technology on bringing Call of Duty: Black Ops III to PlayStation 3 and Xbox 360.

In March 2022, Beenox announced that it would open a second office in Montreal, Quebec, led by Nour Polloni, increasing its staff count by 20%.

== Games developed ==
=== Lead development ===
| Year | Game | Platform(s) | Notes | Ref. |
|---|---|---|---|---|
| 2001 | Pillars of Garendall | Microsoft Windows, Mac OS X | Co-developed with Ambrosia Software | |
| 2007 | Bee Movie Game | Microsoft Windows, PlayStation 2, Xbox 360 | —N/a | |
| 2009 | Monsters vs. Aliens | Microsoft Windows, PlayStation 2, PlayStation 3, Wii, Xbox 360 | —N/a | |
| 2009 | Guitar Hero Smash Hits | PlayStation 2, PlayStation 3, Wii, Xbox 360 | —N/a | |
| 2010 | Spider-Man: Shattered Dimensions | Microsoft Windows, PlayStation 3, Wii, Xbox 360 | —N/a | |
| 2011 | Spider-Man: Edge of Time | Nintendo 3DS, PlayStation 3, Wii, Xbox 360 | —N/a | |
| 2012 | The Amazing Spider-Man | Microsoft Windows, Nintendo 3DS, PlayStation 3, PlayStation Vita, Wii, Wii U, Xbox 360 | —N/a | |
| 2013 | Skylanders: Swap Force | PlayStation 3, PlayStation 4, Wii, Wii U, Xbox 360, Xbox One | Co-developed with Vicarious Visions | |
| 2014 | The Amazing Spider-Man 2 | Microsoft Windows, PlayStation 3, PlayStation 4, Wii U, Xbox 360, Xbox One | —N/a | |
| 2014 | Skylanders: Trap Team | Nintendo 3DS, PlayStation 3, PlayStation 4, Wii, Wii U, Xbox 360, Xbox One | Co-developed with Toys for Bob | |
| 2015 | Skylanders: SuperChargers | iOS, PlayStation 3, PlayStation 4, Wii U, Xbox 360, Xbox One | Co-developed with Vicarious Visions | |
| 2015 | Skylanders: SuperChargers Racing | Nintendo 3DS, Wii | —N/a | |
| 2019 | Crash Team Racing Nitro-Fueled | Nintendo Switch, PlayStation 4, Xbox One | —N/a | |
| 2020 | Call of Duty: Modern Warfare 2 Campaign Remastered | Microsoft Windows, PlayStation 4, Xbox One | —N/a | |
| 2024 | Call of Duty: Warzone Mobile | iOS, Android | Co-developed with Digital Legends Entertainment, Activision Shanghai Studio, Demonware, and Solid State Studios | |
| 2024 | Call of Duty: Black Ops 6 | Microsoft Windows, PlayStation 4, PlayStation 5, Xbox One, Xbox Series X/S | Additional work; led the game's Windows version | |
| 2025 | Call of Duty: Black Ops 7 | Microsoft Windows, PlayStation 4, PlayStation 5, Xbox One, Xbox Series X/S | Led the game's Windows version | |
| 2026 | Call of Duty: Modern Warfare 4 | Microsoft Windows, PlayStation 5, Xbox Series X/S, Nintendo Switch 2 | Additional work; led the game's Windows version | |

=== Support development ===
| Year | Game | Platform(s) | Notes | Ref. |
|---|---|---|---|---|
| 2016 | Call of Duty: Modern Warfare Remastered | Microsoft Windows, PlayStation 4, Xbox One | Additional work | |
| 2017 | Call of Duty: WWII | Microsoft Windows, PlayStation 4, Xbox One | Additional work | |
| 2018 | Call of Duty: Black Ops 4 | Microsoft Windows, PlayStation 4, Xbox One | Additional work | |
| 2019 | Call of Duty: Modern Warfare | Microsoft Windows, PlayStation 4, Xbox One | Additional work | |
| 2020 | Call of Duty: Warzone | Microsoft Windows, PlayStation 4, Xbox One | Additional work | |
| 2020 | Tony Hawk's Pro Skater 1 + 2 | Microsoft Windows, Nintendo Switch, PlayStation 4, PlayStation 5, Xbox One, Xbox Series X/S | Additional work | |
| 2020 | Crash Bandicoot 4: It's About Time | Microsoft Windows, Nintendo Switch, PlayStation 4, PlayStation 5, Xbox One, Xbox Series X/S | Additional work | |
| 2021 | Call of Duty: Vanguard | Microsoft Windows, PlayStation 4, PlayStation 5, Xbox One, Xbox Series X/S | Additional work | |
| 2022 | Call of Duty: Modern Warfare II | Microsoft Windows, PlayStation 4, PlayStation 5, Xbox One, Xbox Series X/S | Additional content development support | |
| 2022 | Call of Duty: Warzone 2.0 | Microsoft Windows, PlayStation 4, PlayStation 5, Xbox One, Xbox Series X/S | Additional content development support | |
| 2023 | Call of Duty: Modern Warfare III | Microsoft Windows, PlayStation 4, PlayStation 5, Xbox One, Xbox Series X/S | Addititional work | |

=== Ports ===
| Year | Game | Platform(s) | Ref. |
|---|---|---|---|
| 2003 | Tony Hawk's Pro Skater 3 | Mac OS X | |
| 2003 | Tony Hawk's Pro Skater 4 | Microsoft Windows, Mac OS X | |
| 2003 | Kelly Slater's Pro Surfer | Microsoft Windows, Mac OS X | |
| 2003 | Wakeboarding Unleashed Featuring Shaun Murray | Microsoft Windows, Mac OS X | |
| 2003 | Tomb Raider: The Angel of Darkness | Mac OS X | |
| 2004 | The Lord of the Rings: The Return of the King | Mac OS X | |
| 2004 | Homeworld 2 | Mac OS X | |
| 2004 | Railroad Tycoon 3 | Mac OS X | |
| 2004 | Tony Hawk's Underground 2 | Microsoft Windows | |
| 2004 | Pitfall: The Lost Expedition | Microsoft Windows | |
| 2004 | The Incredibles | Microsoft Windows, Mac OS X | |
| 2004 | Shrek 2: Team Action | Microsoft Windows | |
| 2004 | MTX Mototrax | Microsoft Windows, Mac OS X | |
| 2005 | Tony Hawk's Underground | Microsoft Windows | |
| 2005 | Madagascar | Microsoft Windows | |
| 2005 | Fantastic Four | Microsoft Windows | |
| 2005 | Star Wars: Battlefront | Mac OS X | |
| 2005 | X-Men Legends II: Rise of Apocalypse | Microsoft Windows | |
| 2005 | Ultimate Spider-Man | Microsoft Windows | |
| 2005 | Myst V: End of Ages | Mac OS X | |
| 2005 | Evil Dead: Regeneration | Microsoft Windows | |
| 2005 | The Incredibles: Rise of the Underminer | Microsoft Windows, Mac OS X | |
| 2005 | Gun | Microsoft Windows | |
| 2005 | MX vs. ATV Unleashed | Microsoft Windows | |
| 2006 | Over the Hedge | Microsoft Windows | |
| 2006 | X-Men: The Official Game | Microsoft Windows | |
| 2006 | Cars | Microsoft Windows, Mac OS X | |
| 2006 | Marvel: Ultimate Alliance | Microsoft Windows | |
| 2007 | Spider-Man 3 | Microsoft Windows | |
| 2007 | Spider-Man: Friend or Foe | Microsoft Windows | |
| 2008 | Kung Fu Panda | Microsoft Windows, Mac OS X | |
| 2008 | 007: Quantum of Solace | Microsoft Windows, Wii | |
| 2009 | Transformers: Revenge of the Fallen | Microsoft Windows | |
| 2015 | Call of Duty: Black Ops III (Note: Co-developed with Mercenary Technology.) | PlayStation 3, Xbox 360 | |

=== Cancelled ===
- The Vatz
