= Infinity Ward =

American video game developer

Infinity Ward, Inc.
- Logo used since 2016
- Type: Subsidiary
- Industry: Video games
- Founded: May 2002; 24 years ago
- Founders: Grant Collier; Jason West; Vince Zampella
- Headquarters: Woodland Hills, Los Angeles, California, US
- Number of locations: 5 (2024)
- Key people: Mark Grigsby (co-studio head); Jack O'Hara (co-studio head); Daniel Nelson (CTO); Joel Emslie (art director)
- Products: Call of Duty series
- Number of employees: 250+ (2015)
- Parent: Activision (2003–present)
- Divisions: Infinity Ward Poland; Infinity Ward Mexico; Infinity Ward Austin; Infinity Ward Barcelona
- Website: infinityward.com

Infinity Ward, Inc. is an American video game developer. They developed the video game Call of Duty, along with several other installments in the Call of Duty series. Vince Zampella, Grant Collier, and Jason West established Infinity Ward in 2002 after working at 2015 previously. All of the 22 original team members of Infinity Ward came from the team that had worked on Medal of Honor: Allied Assault while at 2015. Activision helped fund Infinity Ward in its early days, buying up 30 percent of the company, before eventually fully acquiring them.

The studio's first game, World War II shooter Call of Duty, was released on the PC in 2003. The day after the game was released, Activision bought the rest of Infinity Ward, signing employees to long-term contracts. Infinity Ward went on to make Call of Duty 2, Call of Duty 4: Modern Warfare, Call of Duty: Modern Warfare 2, Call of Duty: Modern Warfare 3, Call of Duty: Ghosts, Call of Duty: Infinite Warfare, the Modern Warfare reboot, and its sequel.

The studio develops the Call of Duty series alongside Treyarch, Sledgehammer Games, and Raven Software. Co-founder Collier left the company in early 2009 to join parent company Activision. In 2010, West and Zampella were fired by Activision for "breaches of contract and insubordination", they soon founded a game studio called Respawn Entertainment. On May 3, 2014, Neversoft was merged into Infinity Ward.

== History ==
Infinity Ward was founded as an independent game studio by Grant Collier, Jason West, and Vince Zampella in 2002, with a publishing agreement with Activision. The studio was formed by several members of 2015, the studio that developed the successful Medal of Honor: Allied Assault for Electronic Arts (EA) in 2002. Dissatisfied with the current contract they had under EA, Collier, West, and Zampella engaged with Activision to help establish Infinity Ward, which became one of the primary studios within Activision for the competing Call of Duty series. Initially, Activision provided Infinity Ward US$1.5 million for 30% stake in the company to start development on the first game Call of Duty, acquiring full ownership in October 2003 after the title was successfully launched. During this period, the studio was about 25 employees including many who followed Collier, West, and Zampella from 2015. Activision allowed Infinity Ward a great deal of freedom in how it developed its titles.

Shortly after this release, Microsoft contacted Activision to seek a Call of Duty title as a launch title for the upcoming Xbox 360 console. Infinity Ward agreed to prepare Call of Duty 2 for release in the last quarter of 2005. Collier said the request would help them lose the stigma of being only a personal computer developer, and so to make sure the console version was on parity, they tripled their staff to about 75 employees. Much of the focus of Infinity Ward's development was improving its game engine to include realistic special effects, such as smoke grenades to hinder sight, or bullets piercing through weak materials. Call of Duty 2 was a major success, having an 85% attach rate to new Xbox 360 console sales, and selling 1.4 million units its first year. At this point, Activision brought in Treyarch, one of their internal studios, to help develop additional Call of Duty games, with Infinity Ward spending the time and effort to improve the game's engine for one game, and Treyarch using the updated engine to create a new title. Treyarch released the next sequel Call of Duty 3 while Infinity Ward itself developed Call of Duty 4: Modern Warfare, which instead of taking place during World War II, was set in a contemporary period with a fictional conflict between superpowers. At the time of Modern Warfare's release, Infinity Ward had more than 100 employees.

=== 2010 employee firings and departures ===
Following the critical and financially successful release of Call of Duty 4: Modern Warfare in 2007, Jason West (president, co-CCO, and CTO) and Vince Zampella (CEO) began contract negotiations with Activision. They promised to deliver Call of Duty: Modern Warfare 2 in 2009, but in exchange asked for extremely large bonuses and creative control of the Call of Duty series. Activision agreed, but added a clause to the contract that should they be fired, the rights to Call of Duty would fall back to Activision.

Following the execution of the contract in 2008, Activision began seeking ways to find reason to fire West and Zampella to trigger the new clause. This in turn led to West and Zampella look to means to make Infinity Ward a studio outside of Activision's control. Events came to a head in February 2010 when Activision hired a law firm to investigate Infinity Ward. On March 1, 2010, West and Zampella were released by Activision for "insubordination", forfeiting the bonuses they had negotiated. The pair went on to form Respawn Entertainment in April 2010 as an independent studio, through working closely with EA on a yet-announced project (revealed in 2013 as Titanfall). Several dozen of Infinity Ward's employees resigned in the following months, many taking up positions at Respawn.

West and Zampella had been replaced on an interim basis by Activision CTO Steve Pearce and head of production Steve Ackrich. By November 2010, Activision had installed new management at Infinity Ward, and Vivendi chairman and CEO Jean-Bernard Lévy stated that Infinity Ward "got over" its problems and are fully reconstructed and that Activision is very happy with the result. The executive went on to say that there will be three studios working on the Call of Duty franchise including the newly formed studio Sledgehammer Games.

Several lawsuits followed in the wake of West and Zampella's departure. The pair themselves initially filed suit against Activision shortly after their release to reclaim "substantial royalty payments" that Activision failed to pay them in the weeks leading up to their firing, estimated to be US$36 million; this figure eventually rose to over US$1 billion by May 2012, based on Activision's filings with the United States Securities and Exchange Commission. Activision countersued the pair in April 2010, calling its actions to fire them justified and asserting the two were "self-serving schemers". Activision amended its suit in December 2010 to include EA as a defendant, stating that its competitor had worked with West and Zampella to "destabilize, disrupt and ... destroy Infinity Ward", and sought US$400 million in damages. Separately, several former and current members of Infinity Ward under the name "Infinity Ward Employee Group" (IWEG) sued Activision for between US$75–125 million for unpaid bonuses for work on Modern Warfare 2 and an additional US$75–500 million in punitive damages. Ultimately by May 2012, Activision had settled with the IWEG for US$42 million, while private settlements were separately reached between Activision and EA, and between Activision, West and Zampella.

=== 2012 departure of Robert Bowling ===
On March 27, 2012, Robert Bowling resigned as creative strategist of Call of Duty and a lead employee at Infinity Ward. In response, Activision issued a statement thanking Bowling for his service. When questioned about his department, Bowling responded "Too much 'pew pew' not enough new new". Signs of disagreement between Bowling and Infinity Ward arose in an interview in February 2012 when he stated: "I feel like we are in a fucking era where everyone is so focused on subscriber numbers and all that stuff that we need to get back to what I feel like we did so much better in the old days of just plain good will, like stuff like the LAN patch, yeah it is lower priority but let's get it out the fucking door. Let's just do it."

=== Neversoft merger and further expansion ===
In May 2014, Neversoft was merged with Infinity Ward to form a single 'super-studio' after both collaborated on the development of Call of Duty: Ghosts. Neversoft studio head Joel Jewett and studio director Scott Pease retired shortly after the completion of the merger. By March 2015, Infinity Ward had over 250 employees.

Infinity Ward presently operates in five locations – California, Texas, Poland, Mexico and Spain. The studio in Kraków, Poland opened in December 2017. The studio serves as a research and development center, and is headed by principal rendering engineer Michal Drobot. The Poland studio assisted in rebuilding the IW engine for the 2019 reboot of Modern Warfare and Call of Duty: Warzone. In October 2021, Infinity Ward opened a new studio in Austin, Texas. In June 2023, Infinity Ward continued to expand with its fifth location, opening a studio in Barcelona, Spain to continue supporting Modern Warfare as well as assisting development in Warzone Mobile.

== Reception ==
Infinity Ward's first title, Call of Duty, was released in October of 2003 to rave reviews. It won Game of the Year at the D.I.C.E. Awards and was also a commercial success, selling over 4.5 million copies by 2023.

Call of Duty 4: Modern Warfare enjoyed massive commercial and critical success, selling over 12 million copies from its release in November 2007 through June 2009. Infinity Ward's sequel to Call of Duty 4: Modern Warfare, Call of Duty: Modern Warfare 2, earned $310 million in North America and the UK on day one (selling 4.7 million copies), beating the previous record held by Grand Theft Auto IV. It grossed an estimated $550 million worldwide in its first five days, and eventually topped $1 billion within two months of release. The sequel to Modern Warfare 2, Call of Duty: Modern Warfare 3, sold 6.5 million copies in the US and UK alone and grossed $400 million within 24 hours of going on sale. It earned $775 million in its first five days, and topped $1 billion after 16 days. All three entries of the original Modern Warfare trilogy were the best-selling games of the years they were released, and won Best Shooter at the Spike Video Game Awards.

Infinity Ward would eventually reboot the Modern Warfare series. The first entry, Call of Duty: Modern Warfare in 2019, broke franchise sales records by earning over $600 million in its first three days, and crossed the $1 billion revenue threshold by December 2019. Its sequel, Call of Duty: Modern Warfare II in 2022, broke franchise and industry sales records by grossing over $800 million in its first three days and reached $1 billion in worldwide sales within just 10 days of its release.

In May 2010, Infinity Ward was ranked second by Develop 100 only running up to developer Nintendo for the top 100 developers based on the sales of their games in the UK.

== Game engines ==
Infinity Ward used the id Tech 3 engine from Quake III Arena with Ritual Entertainment's ÜberTools enhancements for the first Call of Duty in 2003. For Call of Duty 2, Infinity Ward heavily modified the engine, featuring more powerful visuals and DirectX 9 support, and was known internally as the "IW" game engine. The version that was used for Call of Duty 2 was designated as IW 2.0. Call of Duty 4: Modern Warfare runs on a highly upgraded version of the engine from Call of Duty 2 called IW 3.0, with features that include true world-dynamic lighting, HDR lighting effects, dynamic shadows and depth of field. The Call of Duty: Black Ops sub-series and the James Bond video game Quantum of Solace were developed by Treyarch using modified versions of Infinity Ward's engine.

Call of Duty: Modern Warfare 2, uses an upgraded engine named IW 4.0, which is a generation more advanced than the engine used in Call of Duty 4: Modern Warfare. Call of Duty: Modern Warfare 3 uses the MW3 engine (IW 5.0), an improved version of IW 4.0. Improvements on the engine allow better streaming technology which allows larger regions for the game while running at a minimum of 60 frames per second, improvements to the audio of the engine have also been made.

Call of Duty: Ghosts features an upgraded next-generation version of the IW 5.0 seen in Call of Duty: Modern Warfare 3 called IW 6.0. IW 6.0 is compatible with next-gen systems such as Xbox One and PlayStation 4 so polygon counts, texture detail and overall graphical fidelity has been increased. IW 6.0 is also compatible with Microsoft Windows, Wii U, PS3 and Xbox 360. The IW 6.0 engine features technology from Pixar, SubD, which increases the level of detail of models as one gets closer to them. Mark Rubin has said about the HDR lighting "We used to paint it in and cover up the cracks, but now it's all real-time". Call of Duty: Ghosts uses Iris Adjust tech which allows the player to experience from a person's point of view how their eyes would react to changes in lighting conditions realistically. Other features include new animation systems, fluid dynamics, interactive smoke, displacement mapping and dynamic multiplayer maps.

Call of Duty: Infinite Warfare's IW 7.0 features weightlessness system, game physics improvement, improved AI and improved non-player characters behaviors. Infinity Ward collaborated with Raven Software for Call of Duty: Modern Warfare Remastered using the then latest version of the engine in 2016.

Modern Warfare (2019 reboot) and Call of Duty: Warzone uses a heavily rebuilt IW engine for the series (IW 8.0), allowing for the use of more detailed environments, advanced photogrammetry and rendering, better volumetric lighting, and the use of ray tracing. The new engine had been in development five years prior to the release of the game, and was a collaborative effort between the main Infinity Ward studio in California and the new studio in Poland.

Call of Duty: Modern Warfare II uses a highly upgraded version of the engine first used in 2019's Modern Warfare. This engine dubbed IW 9.0, is co-developed by Infinity Ward, Treyarch, and Sledgehammer Games, and will be used in future installments of the series in a unified effort to ensure that every studio is working with the same tools. For Call of Duty: Modern Warfare 4, Infinity Ward dropped support for the eighth generation of video game consoles, allowing a leap in visual quality from the engine. It is the first Call of Duty game to be released exclusively on the ninth generation of video game consoles, as well as the first Call of Duty to be released on a Nintendo platform since Call of Duty: Ghosts in 2013. Upgrades to the engine include more advanced rendering and lighting, as well as dynamic environmental state tracking.

== Games developed ==
=== Lead developer ===
Year	Game	Platforms	Note(s)
2003	Call of Duty	Microsoft Windows, PlayStation 3, Xbox 360, Macintosh	PlayStation 3 and Xbox 360 versions developed by Aspyr as Call of Duty Classic
2005	Call of Duty 2	Microsoft Windows, Xbox 360, Macintosh	Macintosh version developed by i5works
2007	Call of Duty 4: Modern Warfare	Microsoft Windows, PlayStation 3, Xbox 360, Wii, Macintosh	Wii version developed by Treyarch as Call of Duty: Modern Warfare - Reflex Edition
2009	Call of Duty: Modern Warfare 2	Microsoft Windows, PlayStation 3, Xbox 360, Macintosh	Campaign Remastered version developed by Beenox
2011	Call of Duty: Modern Warfare 3	Microsoft Windows, PlayStation 3, Xbox 360, Wii, Macintosh	Co-developed with Sledgehammer Games, assisted by Raven Software, Treyarch and Neversoft; Wii version developed by Treyarch
2013	Call of Duty: Ghosts	Microsoft Windows, PlayStation 3, PlayStation 4, Xbox 360, Xbox One, Wii U	Assisted by Neversoft, Raven Software and Certain Affinity; Wii U version developed by Treyarch
2016	Call of Duty: Infinite Warfare	Microsoft Windows, PlayStation 4. Xbox One	Assisted by Raven Software
2019	Call of Duty: Modern Warfare	Microsoft Windows, PlayStation 4. Xbox One	Assisted by Activision Shanghai, Demonware, High Moon Studios, Beenox, Raven Software and Sledgehammer Games
2020	Call of Duty: Warzone	Microsoft Windows, PlayStation 4. Xbox One	Co-developed with Raven Software, assisted by Beenox, High Moon Studios, Sledgehammer Games, Treyarch, Toys for Bob and Activision Shanghai
2022	Call of Duty: Modern Warfare II	Microsoft Windows, PlayStation 4, PlayStation 5, Xbox One, Xbox Series X and Series S	Assisted by Treyarch, Sledgehammer Games, Raven Software, Toys for Bob, High Moon Studios, Activision Shanghai and Activision Central Tech
2022	Call of Duty: Warzone 2.0	Microsoft Windows, PlayStation 4, PlayStation 5, Xbox One, Xbox Series X and Series S	Co-developed with Raven Software, assisted by Treyarch, Beenox, High Moon Studios, Sledgehammer Games, Toys for Bob and Activision Shanghai
2026	Call of Duty: Modern Warfare 4	Microsoft Windows, Nintendo Switch 2, PlayStation 5, Xbox Series X and Series S	Assisted by Treyarch, Sledgehammer Games, Raven Software, High Moon Studios, Activision Shanghai and Activision Central Tech

=== Support developer ===
Year	Game	Platforms	Note(s)
2017	Call of Duty: WWII	Microsoft Windows, PlayStation 4, PlayStation 5, Xbox One, Xbox Series X and Series S	Assisting Sledgehammer Games
2023	Call of Duty: Modern Warfare III	Microsoft Windows, PlayStation 4, PlayStation 5, Xbox One, Xbox Series X and Series S	Assisting Sledgehammer Games
2024	Call of Duty: Black Ops 6	Microsoft Windows, PlayStation 4, PlayStation 5, Xbox One, Xbox Series X and Series S	Assisting Treyarch and Raven Software
2025	Call of Duty: Black Ops 7	Microsoft Windows, PlayStation 4, PlayStation 5, Xbox One, Xbox Series X and Series S	Assisting Treyarch and Raven Software
