= Call of Duty: Modern Warfare III (2023 video game) =

2023 video game

- Developer: Sledgehammer Games (Note: Zombies mode and Multiplayer Ranked Play developed by Treyarch. Additional development work by Infinity Ward, Raven Software, Beenox, Demonware, High Moon Studios, Activision Shanghai, Activision Central Tech and Toys for Bob.)
- Publisher: Activision
- Directors: Dave Swenson; Greg Reisdorf
- Producer: Trevor Schack
- Designer: Zach Hodson
- Programmer: Jason Bell
- Artists: Joe Salud; Matt Abbott
- Writers: Brian Bloom; Shelby Carleton; Jen Campbell
- Composers: Walter Mair; Jack Wall
- Series: Call of Duty
- Platforms: PlayStation 4; PlayStation 5; Windows; Xbox One; Xbox Series X/S
- Release: November 10, 2023 (Note: Those who digitally pre-ordered Modern Warfare III received access to the game's campaign mode on November 2, 2023.)
- Genre: First-person shooter
- Modes: Single-player, multiplayer

Call of Duty: Modern Warfare III is a 2023 first-person shooter game developed by Sledgehammer Games and published by Activision. It is the twentieth main installment of the Call of Duty series and is the third entry in the rebooted Modern Warfare sub-series, following Call of Duty: Modern Warfare II (2022). Set in 2023, Modern Warfare III's single-player story follows special forces unit Task Force 141 as they pursue Vladimir Makarov, a Russian ultranationalist and terrorist planning to trigger a third World War. The game also includes a multiplayer component and a cooperative open world Zombies mode, co-created by Black Ops sub-series developer Treyarch.

After wrapping development on Call of Duty: Vanguard (2021), Sledgehammer Games were assigned by Activision to develop an expansion pack for Modern Warfare II, which changed to a full, standalone release in the Call of Duty series. After several leaks in early-to-mid 2023, Modern Warfare III was officially revealed in August 2023 via an in-game event in Call of Duty: Warzone. The game was released on November 10, 2023, for PlayStation 4, PlayStation 5, Windows, Xbox One, and Xbox Series X/S.

Upon release, Modern Warfare III received mixed reviews, with criticism for its campaign. It became the second best-selling title of 2023 in the United States, behind Hogwarts Legacy. A sequel, developed by Infinity Ward and titled Call of Duty: Modern Warfare 4, was released in October 2026.

== Gameplay ==
The player aiming at a group of enemies with their weapon. The personal radar is visible in the top left.

Modern Warfare III features similar gameplay to its predecessor and other games in the Call of Duty series. Its single player campaign features a mixture of linear missions, and open-world missions known as "Open Combat Missions". In these missions, players have greater freedom to choose how they want to approach designated objectives, choosing between open combat to stealth and ambush tactics. Players have access to an on-screen map of the area, including a tactical map that outlines objectives and usual equipment, with caches of weapons, gear and specialized equipment on hand. Enemies react accordingly during such missions, searching for players if they lose sight of them, and calling in reinforcements as their numbers decrease in combat.

In Multiplayer, all sixteen maps from Call of Duty: Modern Warfare 2 (2009) are available to play on, with the added ability to vote for maps while in a matchmade lobby (which was absent in some recent titles), and increased player health for longer "time-to-kill" (TTK). The "red dot" minimap that was absent from Modern Warfare II and Call of Duty: Modern Warfare (2019) also returns, allowing players to see enemies on their radar when they fire a weapon without a suppressor. In addition, players are also able to cancel sliding animations (i.e. "slide cancel"). Classic game modes such as "Kill Confirmed" and "Hardpoint" return alongside a new game mode titled "Cutthroat", where three teams of three players go head to head. Players can also engage in the 32v32 "Ground War" mode with a selection of dedicated maps, as well as the "War" mode, returning from Call of Duty: WWII (2017). The game features moderation powered by artificial intelligence, listening in on in-game interactions and immediately reporting any overly-toxic behavior. At least twelve new 6v6 multiplayer maps have been confirmed to release post-launch, while fan-favorite Modern Warfare II maps will also be added every season.

An open world player versus environment (PvE) Zombies mode, developed by Treyarch in collaboration with Sledgehammer Games, is also included in the game. The game mode is structured similarly to the DMZ mode in Call of Duty: Warzone, rather than the round-based survival experience from older Zombies modes. Up to 24 players play together as separate squads in a large-sized map, which is also used as the new battle royale map for Warzone. Each team can tackle zombies, as well as AI-controlled human enemies, to complete objectives around the map, as well as collect loot and sell them at buy stations, or extract them via exfiltration. In place of rounds, the map is divided into "zones", with varying levels of threat indicating the difficulty. After 45 minutes of in-match time, an "Aether Storm" begins to expand and cover the map, leaving players with 15 minutes to exfil with their loot. Core mechanics from previous Zombies modes return, such as weapon wallbuys, Perk-a-Cola drinks, and the Mystery Box. Players can also extract "acquisitions", which are items that can be stored or brought into subsequent matches for use, or "schematics", which allow them to craft said items, with a cooldown limit. Story quests are also featured in the mode, which further progress the narrative.

== Plot ==
=== Campaign ===
In November 2023, operatives working for the Russian private military company Konni Group raid a prison complex in Verdansk, Kastovia, where they free their commander, Vladimir Makarov (Julian Kostov), an ultranationalist terrorist who was sentenced to life imprisonment following his capture by SAS operatives John "Soap" MacTavish (Neil Ellice) and John Price (Barry Sloane) during an attack on the city in April 2019. Hours later, Konni assaults a port in Urzikstan, where the Urzikstan Liberation Force (ULF), led by Farah Karim (Claudia Doumit) and ex-CIA officer Alex Keller (Chad Michael Collins), was planning to obtain ballistic missiles from the American PMC Shadow Company and their commander, Phillip Graves (Warren Kole), who faked his death after he and General Herschel Shepherd (Glenn Morshower) betrayed special forces unit Task Force 141. (Note: As depicted in Call of Duty: Modern Warfare II (2022)) The missiles are stolen, though Farah manages to place trackers on them.

Having learned of Makarov's escape from CIA Station Chief Kate Laswell (Rya Kihlstedt), Price leads 141 to an abandoned nuclear power plant to prevent Konni from securing nuclear material left behind following the death of Urzikstan's former ruler, General Roman Barkov. (Note: As depicted in Call of Duty: Modern Warfare (2019)) They find, however, that the plant is actually carrying leftover chemical materials that Barkov had hidden within and that Makarov plans to refine it into a deadly chemical weapon; in the ensuing firefight, Konni escapes with the material, but some of it is released, nearly killing Price. To determine Makarov's plans, Laswell infiltrates a military base in Verdansk and meets with Colonel Yuri Volkov (Raphael Corkhill), who supplies a flash drive containing information on Barkov's chemical weapons; Laswell flees the base moments into an attack with the stolen missiles. Meanwhile, Makarov has a Kastovian airliner destroyed, using a vest bomb forced onto a former ULF fighter who was traveling aboard; Farah and Alex swiftly neutralize Konni forces at the plane's crash site in Urzikstan and wipe all flight recorders to prevent Makarov from pinning the attack on the ULF.

In wake of the attacks, Price reluctantly accepts assistance from Shepherd, who is seeking to return to the United States after being forced into hiding, when he and Graves make contact with Laswell; through their intel, Soap and Lieutenant Simon "Ghost" Riley (Samuel Roukin) locate and interrogate Makarov's financier, Milena Romanova (Tina Ivlev). Price and Sergeant Kyle "Gaz" Garrick (Elliot Knight) use Romanova's information and deploy in Saint Petersburg, where they apprehend Konni operative Andrei Nolan (Nikolai Nikolaeff), leading them to intercept a convoy moving across Siberia to a former Soviet prison. They find that the convoy's cargo is Shepherd, who had been captured by Makarov, and decide to give him an ultimatum: either give them all of his intel on Makarov's plans, agree to testify to his actions before the United States Congress, and keep Graves in check, or be left for dead in Siberia; Shepherd agrees, revealing that Makarov plans to destroy the Gora Dam in Verdansk to flood the city and kill its populace.

While Soap and Ghost work to prevent Konni from destroying the Gora Dam, Farah, Alex, Price and Gaz lead an assault on a Konni base in Urzikstan, reluctantly accepting aid from Graves and Shadow Company. After resolving both issues, Shepherd and Graves return to the United States and testify to Congress about their actions, effectively turning on each other during questioning. 141 resumes their pursuit of Makarov after learning that MI6 detected Konni radio chatter in London. Shadowing a Konni contact, the group discovers Makarov has hacked into the UK's train network and deduces that he intends to trap all trains in the Channel Tunnel and destroy it; backed up by CTSFO units, Price leads an assault on the tunnel. He and Soap locate a dirty bomb and begin defusing it, but they are ambushed by Makarov, who tries to execute Price, but is stabbed by Soap, who is in turn killed by Makarov; Ghost and Gaz reinforce Price and help him disarm the bomb. Afterwards, the trio scatter Soap's ashes and honor his memory. In a mid-credits scene, Price assassinates Shepherd in his office.

=== Zombies ===
In 2021, during a raid on a hotel in Zaravan, Urzikstan, arms dealer Victor Zakhaev (Dave B. Mitchell) and ex-NZDF operative Jack Fletcher (Luke Cook) recover vials containing "Aetherium", a substance of extradimensional origin. During their escape from police forces, Zakhaev throws one of the vials; the resulting blast stuns the police and transforms the dead into zombies. Weeks later, as part of Operation Deadbolt—a CIA contingency plan formed to contain the undead threat—Soap and a strike team of operatives are sent by Laswell and SSO Selma Greene (Debra Wilson) to ensure that nothing escapes from the Zaravan exclusion zone; accompanying them is Sergei Ravenov (Andrew Morgado), a former Spetsnaz captain who helped the classified CIA task force "Requiem" in thwarting zombie incursions during the Cold War. (Note: As depicted in Black Ops Cold War (2020)) Working with a defecting scientist, Ava Jansen (Denise Hoey), Deadbolt constructs an "Aetherium Neutralizer" device and prepares to use it to cleanse the exclusion zone, but faces opposition from Zakhaev's forces and the undead. The Neutralizer's activation creates a dimensional vortex, which forces Fletcher and Zakhaev to retreat; through the vortex, an entity lifts Ava and demands entry, causing her to briefly faint.

While the Neutralizer is initially successful, undead contacts begin to reappear across Zaravan. Meanwhile, Ava begins researching into Requiem's past, including their senior staff, an operation called "Project Janus", and a woman named Samantha Maxis; when questioned by Ava about Requiem, Ravenov says that Maxis sacrificed herself to end the Cold War-era outbreaks and that they had tried, but failed, to rescue her, but refuses to divulge any further information until the Zaravan outbreak is contained. After she is lured into the "Dark Aether" dimension—the origin of the undead—by the entity she encountered in Zaravan and is subsequently rescued by Ravenov and the strike team, Ava is shown a recording of her birth mother, Requiem scientist Elizabeth Grey (Amy Pemberton), from 1996, which reveals that Ava is Maxis' biological daughter, and Grey gave birth to her via surrogacy, using DNA samples of Maxis and Ravenov; due to Maxis' exposure to the Dark Aether, Ava was born with a strong bond to the dimension, and the entity was a reflection of her born at the same time. Angered at the revelation, Ava scolds Ravenov for not telling her the truth before storming off.

Eventually, Ava returns to the Dark Aether to sever her connection to the entity and kill it, enlisting Ravenov and the strike team to help her. They succeed in doing so, though in its final moments, the entity warns Ava that "the Shadowsmiths" are coming for her. Three months later, Ava continues to pursue Project Janus, this time by traveling to Liberty Falls, a small West Virginian town where a Dark Aether incursion occurred in February 1991. (Note: As depicted in Call of Duty: Black Ops 6 (2024)) While conversing with Ravenov on a phone inside her hotel room, Ava hears a distorted voice calling out to her. A hand emerges from a mirror, pulling Ava through a portal.

== Development ==
Modern Warfare III was developed by Sledgehammer Games, and is the fifth mainline Call of Duty title that the studio has worked on, after co-creating 2011's Modern Warfare 3 with Infinity Ward and developing 2014's Advanced Warfare, 2017's WWII and 2021's Vanguard. After wrapping development on Vanguard, Sledgehammer Games began early work on a sequel to Advanced Warfare, but Activision chose to shelve the project before it could get far into production and assign the studio to create an expansion pack for the then-upcoming Call of Duty: Modern Warfare II (2022). According to Bloomberg News's Jason Schreier, the expansion was originally intended to feature a new, smaller-scale single-player campaign, which was planned to be set in Mexico, along with new content for Modern Warfare II's multiplayer component.

By Summer 2022, however, Activision chose to reboot the project entirely, tasking Sledgehammer Games with creating a direct, fully-fledged sequel to Modern Warfare II that would feature a rebooted version of original Modern Warfare trilogy antagonist Vladimir Makarov. This decision left the studio's developers with roughly sixteen months to develop Modern Warfare III, which was a similar schedule to what they faced when developing Vanguard. Treyarch, the lead developer behind the Black Ops sub-series, were also tasked with creating a Zombies mode for Modern Warfare III, making it the first Modern Warfare title to feature a Zombies mode.

In another report from Schreier, some developers at Sledgehammer Games claimed that they had initially not been made aware of the decision to turn the project into a full release, leading to crunch. In addition, certain developers were also frustrated with executives at Infinity Ward, who had stepped in at numerous times during development to make significant changes to the project. Aaron Halon, Sledgehammer Games' studio head, has publicly denied Schreier's reporting, stating that plans for the game began "long before we wrapped up our previous game" and that Modern Warfare III was "a labor of love" that had been "years in the making".

=== Leaks ===
A large amount of content for Modern Warfare III was leaked before being officially revealed. Around July 17, 2023, the "red dot" minimap, War mode, and new perks were leaked from an internal alpha build. On July 24, 2023, the game's key art was leaked in a Monster Energy promotion, featuring an image of Captain Price behind the Modern Warfare III logo. Around the time of the key art leak, several new weapons were datamined. The key art leak was confirmed real by Activision, who issued copyright takedowns and acknowledged the leak via Twitter with sarcastic tweets.

=== Music ===
Walter Mair composed the score for Modern Warfare III, following Sarah Schachner's departure from the rebooted Modern Warfare sub-series over challenges in the working dynamic with Infinity Ward's audio director. Mair has previously worked with the Call of Duty franchise on Call of Duty: Mobile. In addition to Mair's score, Modern Warfare III also features a Zombies score composed by Jack Wall, who frequently partners with Treyarch on the Black Ops sub-series. Additional music was composed by Steve Ouimette, who previously worked on Modern Warfare II season 2's soundtrack.

The soundtrack for Modern Warfare III was released to digital platforms simultaneously with the game's release on November 10, 2023. In addition, rapper 21 Savage released a song in promotion of the game, titled "Call Me Revenge", featuring singer d4vd.

== Marketing and release ==
On August 7, 2023, a teaser trailer was posted, confirming the title. Around this time, a phone number was set up by Activision that was shared via social media. This phone number, after participants agreed to a few terms, would begin sending anonymous messages to participants, such as "we need someone like you, with experience in Al Mazrah." This phone number was noted to give unusual responses when sent the word "zombies" or the names of multiplayer maps from Call of Duty: Modern Warfare 2 (ex. "Rust"). A day later, on August 8, Activision confirmed that Modern Warfare II operators, weapons and cosmetic items would carry over into Modern Warfare III and released a blog post detailing the specifics of the carry-over.

On August 17, a full reveal took place inside of a Call of Duty: Warzone event, which concluded with a reveal trailer. Pre-orders were also opened, with players being able to play the campaign up to a week early, as well as gain access to new operator skins and an open beta for the multiplayer mode.

Modern Warfare III was released on November 10, 2023, for PlayStation 4, PlayStation 5, Windows, Xbox One, and Xbox Series X/S. Similar to Modern Warfare II, the campaign was released in early access for all digital pre-orders, starting from November 2. In July 2024, Modern Warfare III was made available to Xbox Game Pass subscribers. In October 2024, Xbox Game Pass Ultimate members were granted the ability to stream the title via Xbox Cloud Gaming.

=== Post-release promotions ===
As with previous Call of Duty titles, Modern Warfare III features free seasonal content updates with an in-game store selling cosmetic item bundles via microtransactions.

Similar to past Call of Duty season updates, Activision partners with several media franchises to feature celebrities and licensed characters in the playable roster for multiplayer and Zombies modes. New additions include: Paul Atreides and Feyd-Rautha Harkonnen from the film Dune: Part Two; A-Train and Firecracker from Amazon Prime Video's The Boys TV series; Rick Grimes, Michonne, and Daryl Dixon from AMC's The Walking Dead TV series; the comedy duo Cheech & Chong; basketball player Devin Booker; WWE wrestlers Rhea Ripley, Cody Rhodes and Rey Mysterio; Eric Draven / The Crow from the film The Crow (2024); Michael Myers from the Halloween franchise; Art the Clown from the Terrifier film series; and Sam from the film Trick 'r Treat (2007). Additional themed cosmetic packs were also released in promotion of the Warhammer 40,000 franchise, the MonsterVerse film Godzilla x Kong: The New Empire, the Gundam franchise, the Fallout franchise, and the film Smile 2 (2024).

== Reception ==
Reception

Aggregate scores
Aggregator	Score
Metacritic	(PC) 58/100 (PS5) 56/100 (XSXS) 61/100
OpenCritic	13% recommend

Review scores
Publication	Score
Eurogamer	2/5
Famitsu	32/40
Game Informer	5/10
GameSpot	SP: 5/10; MP & MWZ: 7/10
GamesRadar+	2/5
IGN	SP: 4/10; MP: 6/10; MWZ: 6/10
PC Gamer (US)	47%
The Guardian	4/5
Video Games Chronicle	2/5

The pre-release reviews of Modern Warfare III's campaign were negative, with critics highlighting that it felt shallow, short, and rushed. IGN gave the campaign a 4/10, describing it as "bizarrely cobbling together pieces of the Warzone mode into actively bad sandbox missions".

Upon the game's official release, it received "mixed or average reviews" from critics, according to review aggregator website Metacritic, with 13% of critics recommending the game on aggregator OpenCritic. It is the lowest-rated mainline Call of Duty installment on Metacritic.

Bleacher Report called the campaign "disappointing", but praised the technical aspects as "top notch". Both The Guardian and Windows Central gave the game a 4 out of 5 star rating and particularly praised the multiplayer component, with the latter stating that it "perfectly executes blending old maps with modern gameplay."

=== Sales ===
In the United Kingdom and the United States, Modern Warfare III topped the sales charts for the month of November 2023. However, sales figures were reported to be around 38% down from Modern Warfare II's figures during the first three weeks of its launch. Modern Warfare III was the second overall best-selling game of 2023 in the United States, behind Hogwarts Legacy. In Japan, the PlayStation 5 version of Modern Warfare III was the fourth best-selling retail game during its first week of release, with 22,132 physical copies being sold.

=== Awards ===
Year	Ceremony	Category	Result	Ref.
2024	27th Annual D.I.C.E. Awards	Online Game of the Year	Nominated	
2024	20th British Academy Games Awards	Audio Achievement	Nominated	
2024	20th British Academy Games Awards	Multiplayer	Nominated	
2024	20th British Academy Games Awards	Technical Achievement	Longlisted	
2024	Ivor Novello Awards	Best Original Video Game Score	Nominated	
2025	Game Audio Network Guild Awards	Audio of the Year	Nominated	
2025	Game Audio Network Guild Awards	Best Audio Mix	Nominated	
2025	Game Audio Network Guild Awards	Best Cinematic & Cutscene Audio	Nominated	
2025	Game Audio Network Guild Awards	Best Ensemble Cast Performance	Nominated	
2025	Game Audio Network Guild Awards	Best Game Foley	Nominated	
2025	Game Audio Network Guild Awards	Best Game Trailer Audio	Nominated	
2025	Game Audio Network Guild Awards	Best Performance (Claudia Doumit as Farah)	Nominated	
2025	Game Audio Network Guild Awards	Dialogue of the Year	Nominated	
2025	Game Audio Network Guild Awards	Sound Design of the Year	Won	

== Sequel ==
A sequel to Modern Warfare III, developed by Infinity Ward and titled Call of Duty: Modern Warfare 4, was released on October 23, 2026.
