= Call of Duty: Warzone (2020 video game) =

2020 video game

- Developers: Raven Software; Infinity Ward
- Publisher: Activision
- Series: Call of Duty
- Engine: IW 8.0
- Platforms: PlayStation 4; Windows; Xbox One
- Release: March 10, 2020
- Genres: Battle royale, first-person shooter
- Mode: Multiplayer

Call of Duty: Warzone (Note: Following the release of Call of Duty: Warzone 2.0 (2022), Warzone was renamed to Call of Duty: Warzone Caldera.) was a free-to-play battle royale first-person shooter game developed by Raven Software and Infinity Ward and published by Activision as part of the Call of Duty video game series. It was released on March 10, 2020, for PlayStation 4, Windows, and Xbox One as part of Call of Duty: Modern Warfare (2019) and was subsequently connected to Call of Duty: Black Ops Cold War (2020) and Call of Duty: Vanguard (2021), but did not require purchase of any of the aforementioned titles. Warzone allowed online multiplayer combat among 150 players and featured both cross-platform play and cross-platform progression between the three aforementioned titles.

At launch, the game featured two main game modes: Battle Royale and Plunder. Warzone introduced a new in-game currency system that could be used at "Buy Stations" in and around the map. "Loadout Drops" were a key in-game object allowing players to access and switch between their customized classes, which are pre-selected weapon and perk combinations, and were obtainable through purchase with the Cash currency. At launch, Warzone only offered Trios, a squad capacity of three players; Solos, Duos and Quads were added to the game via post-launch updates.

Upon release, Warzone received generally favorable reviews from critics. Warzone was downloaded by six million people within 24 hours of its initial release; by April 2021, the game surpassed 100 million downloads. A successor to Warzone, initially titled Call of Duty: Warzone 2.0 before it was also shortened to Call of Duty: Warzone, was released on November 16, 2022. A mobile version of Warzone, titled Call of Duty: Warzone Mobile, was announced in March 2022, and was released on March 21, 2024. In June 2023, Activision announced that servers for Warzone would be shut down on September 21, 2023, to focus development on Warzone 2.0.

== Gameplay ==
Warzone is the second main battle royale installment in the Call of Duty franchise, following the "Blackout" mode of Call of Duty: Black Ops 4. Warzone differs from Black Ops 4 by reducing reliance on equipable gadgets and instead encouraging the accumulation of a new in-game currency called "Cash". The game supports up to 150 players in a single match, which exceeds the typical "100 players" size that is seen in other battle royale titles.

=== Game modes ===
At launch, Warzone featured two primary game modes: Battle Royale and Plunder. These game modes were initially playable in a squad capacity of three players ("Trios"); post-launch updates made the modes playable in other squad sizes, such as Solos, Duos and Quads. In addition to Battle Royale and Plunder, several new game modes were added later, including various limited-time modes and the "Resurgence" game mode. In Warzone, Resurgence was added with the Season One update for Call of Duty: Black Ops Cold War. In Warzone 2.0, it was added with the Season Two update for Call of Duty: Modern Warfare II. Warzone has also been used to reveal upcoming Call of Duty titles through similar limited-time gamemodes.

==== Battle Royale ====
The Battle Royale mode is similar to other titles in the genre, where players compete in a continuously shrinking map to be the last player remaining. Players parachute onto a large game map with a basic un-customized pistol and two armor plates, where they encounter other players. Players can pick up most components found in a standard loadout (primary and secondary weapons, lethal and tactical equipment, field upgrades, and "killstreaks") as they search the map for items scattered across the ground and from supply boxes found in designated locations. Players can also pick up additional armor plates for increased protection.

After several minutes have passed within the match, "Loadout Drops" will begin to spawn at various points of the map, allowing players to equip custom loadouts; Loadout Drops can also be purchased by players at a "Buy Station" using Cash. As the game progresses and players are eliminated, the playable area shrinks, forcing the remaining players into tighter spaces; the non-playable areas become contaminated with a yellow gas that depletes health and eventually kills the player if they do not return to the safe playable area.

Character death in Battle Royale does not necessarily translate to player defeat like in other titles. Instead, the mode offers a respawn mechanic which players can take advantage of in various ways. Players who are killed are transported to the "Gulag", where they engage in one-on-one combat with another defeated player, with both players being given the same weaponry. Players may only enter the gulag after their first death in a match. The winner of this combat is respawned into the game. Other methods of respawn are available using the in-game currency system.

==== Plunder ====
In the Plunder mode, teams have to search for stacks of Cash scattered around the map to accumulate $1 million. Once found or if time is almost up, the game goes into overtime, multiplying all Cash sums by 1.5. The team who has gathered the most money when the clock runs out is declared the winner. Players respawn automatically in this gamemode. Players spawn with custom loadouts, similar to regular multiplayer modes.

==== Resurgence ====
Resurgence, a mode introduced with the integration of content from Black Ops Cold War into Warzone, is a modified Battle Royale mode; upon death, players are respawned into the match as long as there is at least one squadmate alive in their team. If the entire squad is wiped, they are eliminated from the match. In solo modes, each player is given a respawn timer to wait out before they can respawn again. The Gulag is not employed in Resurgence modes.

=== Maps ===
==== Verdansk ====
Verdansk was the original map featured in Warzone's launch in March 2020 for the content seasons of Modern Warfare and Black Ops Cold War. It was themed after the fictional city shown in Modern Warfare's campaign and multiplayer modes. It is divided into five main sectors that are further divided into zones, each with a unique point of interest. The map is based on the real-life Donetsk city.

An updated version of the map, titled "Verdansk '84", was released in April 2021 alongside the third post-launch season for Black Ops Cold War; it was unveiled after the nuclear destruction of its modern-day counterpart. The majority of structures and locations were rethemed and revisited, along with global touch-ups across the entire map. The map featured seven new locations, five revamped locations, the removal of several structures and obstacles, and the addition of a new centerpiece, the Grid Radar Array. Several new locations and points of interest were added to the map as the integrated seasons of Cold War and Warzone progressed. These included Nakatomi Plaza, survival camps, CIA outposts, several satellite crash sites, and "Red Doors". Also featured were new global weapon loadout changes from Modern Warfare to Cold War, with weapons from the former still being accessible via Loadout Drops.

==== Rebirth Island ====
Rebirth Island was the second map introduced in the game with the integration of Black Ops Cold War's contents. The map was based on the real-life Vozrozhdeniya Island, which was also featured in the campaign mode of Call of Duty: Black Ops. Design-wise, the map is a re-imagination of "Alcatraz Island", previously featured in Black Ops 4's Blackout mode. Unlike Verdansk, Rebirth Island is smaller in scale, only allowing 40 players maximum per match. An updated version of the map, titled "Rebirth Island Reinforced", was released in March 2022, featuring two new points of interest, Stronghold and Docks, and various cosmetic tweaks.

==== Caldera ====
Caldera was a World War II-themed island map, released with the first post-launch season for Call of Duty: Vanguard in December 2021, replacing Verdansk as the primary map for Battle Royale and Plunder modes. The map is characterized by dense forests, caves, and large water-based areas. Caldera remained as the only playable map within Warzone, following the release of its 2022 successor, up until the game's shutdown.

==== Fortune's Keep ====
Fortune's Keep was a small-sized island map introduced with the fourth post-launch season for Vanguard. The map takes place in a Mediterranean setting, with seaside town areas and coves, in addition to water-based areas similar to Caldera.

== Plot ==
Warzone's story is intertwined with the seasonal narratives of Modern Warfare, Black Ops Cold War and Vanguard. Verdansk is used as a common setting across various multiplayer maps in Modern Warfare, while Rebirth Island is inspired by locations and stories in previous Black Ops games. Caldera and Fortune's Keep complement Vanguard's seasonal story.

=== Modern Warfare story arc ===
In 2020, following an attack orchestrated by terrorists Khaled Al-Asad and Victor Zakhaev, the city of Verdansk is engulfed in a cloud of toxic gas. The Armistice, a joint faction consisting of Russian (Allegiance) and NATO (Coalition) operators, quickly disbands amidst the chaos of the attack, while the operators form smaller sub-factions as they fight one another for survival. The remaining Armistice leaders attempt to track down Zakhaev and learn of his plans. Following months of searching, Task Force 141, led by Captain John Price, eventually locates Zakhaev and stops him from launching a nuclear missile.

Several months later, in February 2021, a Soviet-era cargo ship, named Vodianoy, appears and crashes on the shores of Verdansk, long after its disappearance in 1984 during the transportation of a large supply of lethal gas, named Nova 6. The ship breaks in half, unleashing hordes of the undead into the wild. In the following weeks, the undead tread throughout the city, leaving behind contamination traces. Armistice deploys its forces to Verdansk and they attempt to contain the threat, but are largely unsuccessful in doing so.

After two months of fighting, on April 21, 2021, a full evacuation of the city is ordered and Armistice launches a final attempt at eliminating the undead threat. Within 45 minutes of its start, however, the operation is deemed to be a lost cause. In a last-ditch effort to stop the undead from spreading beyond the confines of Verdansk, Armistice Central Command launches a ballistic missile strike towards the Kastovian capital, annihilating both the undead threat and large portions of city in the process; though by November 2023, several major areas of Verdansk, including the Zordaya Prison Complex, had been restored to operational capacity. (Note: As depicted in the Modern Warfare III campaign mission Operation 627)

=== Black Ops Cold War story arc ===
In 1984, Perseus operative Vikhor "Stitch" Kuzmin rebuilds and recommissions Rebirth Island's facilities for production of the lethal Nova 6 gas. At some point, the cargo ship Vodianoy departs from the island, only to mysteriously disappear in the middle of the sea. Some time later, Stitch lures his nemesis, CIA agent Russell Adler, into a trap and captures him. The CIA conducts a search and rescue operation, and eventually tracks Adler from Laos to Verdansk, where Stitch holds him captive. A CIA squad led by Frank Woods rescues Adler in Verdansk, while Stitch continues to carry out his plan: to reactivate Project Nova, a numbers broadcast program once helmed by Nikita Dragovich, as well as to seize control of various brainwashed sleeper agents embedded in Verdansk.

The CIA eventually learns that Adler has been off-grid in Verdansk, potentially compromised due to the numbers program. Adler is apprehended and eventually cured of his brainwashing; at the same time, Stitch and other Perseus agents learn of several explosive charges placed around Verdansk by Adler, and fail to stop their detonation. Adler deploys to Verdansk, alongside Woods, Alex Mason and Jason Hudson to thwart Stitch's plan. They eventually find Stitch in the woods, where he reveals himself as the bearer of the Perseus mantle, while the previous holder had died from cancer in 1983, much to Adler's dismay. Stitch surrenders his life to Adler, while taunting him of his actions; a gunshot is heard as the scene fades to black.

Several days later, Adler, Mason, Hudson and Woods investigate a buried German WWII bunker in the ruins of Verdansk, where they meet Captain Carver Butcher, a retired Special Operations Executive agent who created the first spec-ops task force, Vanguard. Butcher then tells Adler and the others of his mission to hunt down remnants of the Nazi empire, which began in the Pacific.

=== Vanguard story arc ===
In December 1944, Butcher authorizes Operation Vulcan, a top-secret SOE mission to infiltrate Caldera Island and track down fleeing Axis soldiers and scientists. While nearing the island, accompanied by Task Force Trident, their plane is shot, forcing Trident to jump out while Butcher crashes near the beach. As the three Trident operators attempt to navigate the island, Butcher emerges from the crash and finds an entrance to a Nazi bunker near the beach. Intel from the bunker reveals that the Nazis were working on a chemical weapon, named Nebula V. Some time later, Butcher travels to the Swiss Alps with Task Force Yeti, where the Nazis are keeping the Nebula V gas in a fortress. The task force storms the fortress, but is unable to stop the Nazi commander from unleashing the gas. Butcher and the task force barely manage to escape as the gas engulfs the fortress.

The Nazis begin to deploy Nebula V across the world, hitting major cities such as Paris and London, as well as Caldera. In March 1951, Butcher dispatches Task Force Harpy to Caldera to intercept a Nazi arms convoy, where they find a radio emitting a mysterious primal sound. Butcher laments that the release of Nebula V has awakened something powerful near Caldera. The island would eventually become a battleground between two gigantic monsters, the kaiju Godzilla and the gorilla Kong.

By 1976, the Task Forces under Butcher's command begin to take up mercenary work, in hopes of recovering Nazi gold and other sources of wealth. Butcher leads his own squad, Task Force Immortal, to investigate the crash site of a helicopter carrying a gold shipment, but is met with hostility from Vanguard squad leader Arthur Kingsley, who has formed his own mercenary team comprising members from other task forces.

== Announcement and release ==
Warzone was released on March 10, 2020, following a series of glitches and leaks in the preceding month. The existence of the game had been leaked a month prior by a post on Reddit, and a software glitch that same month briefly allowed players to view an early version of the launch map, Verdansk. On March 8, 2020, two days before release, YouTube content creator Chaos published an 11-minute video, featuring pre-release gameplay of the title. The video was removed, and on March 9, Activision officially announced that Warzone would be released on March 10. In March 2022, Activision announced the development of a mobile version of Warzone, which was released on March 21, 2024.

On March 11, 2020, Activision announced that Warzone had been downloaded by six million people in the first 24 hours. On March 13, 2020, the official Call of Duty Twitter account announced that Warzone had crossed 15 million players earlier in the day. On April 10, 2020, Activision announced that Warzone had surpassed over 50 million downloads in its first month. By April 2021, Warzone reached more than 100 million downloads worldwide.

=== Post-launch content integrations ===
For the release of Call of Duty: Black Ops Cold War, Activision and Treyarch announced that the game would feature a unified progression system with Warzone, allowing items from Cold War multiplayer modes to be usable within Warzone, alongside Modern Warfare items players have earned or purchased. On November 13, 2020, to coincide with Cold War's release, operator characters from Cold War were added to Warzone's playable roster. Season 1 of Cold War content was released on December 16, 2020, which integrated Cold War's weapons and their associated cosmetic items into Warzone.

For the release of Call of Duty: Vanguard, a second content integration was announced for Warzone by Activision and Sledgehammer Games. As with the Cold War integration, new items from Vanguard, including operator characters and weapons, would be added to Warzone while allowing players to retain items from Modern Warfare and Cold War. An early integration was included with the Cold War Season 6 update in October 2021, which featured cosmetic blueprints for two Vanguard weapons added to Warzone as additional free items from the seasonal battle pass. The full integration was released on December 8, 2021, to coincide with the launch of Vanguard's first post-launch season.

=== Shutdown ===
In June 2023, Activision announced that online servers for Warzone would be shut down on September 21, 2023, in order to focus all development resources on supporting Warzone's successor, Warzone 2.0.

== Reception ==
Reception

Aggregate scores
Aggregator	Score
Metacritic	PC: 80/100; PS4: 79/100; XONE: 79/100
OpenCritic	78% recommend

Review scores
Publication	Score
GameSpot	7/10
IGN	7/10
VG247	3/5

Call of Duty: Warzone received "generally favorable" reviews from critics across all platforms, according to review aggregator Metacritic. OpenCritic determined that 78% of critics recommended the game.

GameSpot gave the game a 7/10 rating, summarizing with: "Warzone is a great sophomore attempt at a battle royale from Call of Duty, which finally manages to carve out its own identity with interesting spins on the existing formula. Its subversion of death and the nail-biting Gulag duels give you more ways to stay in a match, while also forcing you to be aware of your surroundings even after wiping a rival squad." IGN also gave the game a 7/10 review score, stating: "Call of Duty: Warzone's beta remains thoroughly enjoyable even in spite of the serious concessions to depth made in the name of instant gratification."

Warzone has been heavily criticized for its large download size, which culminated in October 2020 with the game widely reported to no longer fit on a 250GB SSD.

Although not considered a mainline title in the Call of Duty franchise, the staff of GameSpot ranked Warzone the third best game in the series in 2024. They wrote that the title made itself stand apart amongst other battle royale games by offering the "trademark gunplay [and] weapons" of the series and offering a "feel" that was "unmatched". The same year, Dan Wenerowicz of Complex Networks ranked Warzone the sixth best Call of Duty title, noting the game's lasting impact on the franchise.

=== Accolades ===
Warzone was nominated for the "Best Multiplayer" and "Best Ongoing Game" awards at The Game Awards 2020.

== Successor ==
On February 11, 2022, Activision announced that alongside 2022's Call of Duty: Modern Warfare II, developer Infinity Ward was also working on "a new Warzone experience" designed from the ground-up. On June 8, 2022, Activision officially announced Call of Duty: Warzone 2.0; it was released shortly after the release of Modern Warfare II, on November 16, 2022. Following the Season 4 content update for Modern Warfare II, Warzone 2.0 changed its name to simply Warzone.
