= Christopher Ruocchio =

American science fiction and fantasy writer

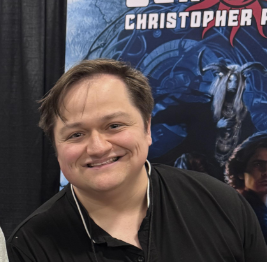
- Born: North Carolina
- Education: North Carolina State University
- Occupations: Writer; Editor
- Writing career
- Years active: 2018–present
- Genres: Space opera; Fantasy
- Notable work: The Sun Eater series
- Notable awards: Manly Wade Wellman Award (2019)
- Website: highmatterbooks.com

Christopher Ruocchio is an American author of science fiction and fantasy novels. He is best known for The Sun Eater series, the first of which earned him the 2019 Manly Wade Wellman Award. The second book in the series, Howling Dark, was nominated for a 2020 Dragon Award. He is a former assistant editor at Baen Books and has co-edited four genre anthologies.

== Biography ==
Christopher Ruocchio was born in North Carolina in the United States. He is Roman Catholic and attended Catholic schools until high school. He attended North Carolina State University where he graduated with a bachelor's degree in English rhetoric and minored in classics. He has cited the works of J.R.R. Tolkien, Gene Wolfe, Robert E. Howard, Frank Herbert, Dan Simmons, Tim Powers, Guy Gavriel Kay, H.P. Lovecraft, Lois McMaster Bujold, as well as the original Star Wars trilogy, as influences. He became an assistant editor at Baen Books in 2015. His first published work was "Not Made for Us", published in March 2018 in the Star Destroyers anthology he co-edited with Tony Daniel.

His first novel, Empire of Silence, was published by DAW Books in July that same year. Ruocchio won the 2019 Manly Wade Wellman Award for Empire. His second anthology, Space Pioneers (co-edited with Hank Davis), was released by Baen that year in November. It included one of his short stories, "The Parliament of Owls". The second book in his Sun Eater series, Howling Dark, was released in July 2019. It was nominated for a 2020 Dragon Award for Best Military Science Fiction or Fantasy Novel.

Ruocchio self-published a novella, The Lesser Devil, in his Sun Eater series in February 2020. The anthologies Overruled! and Cosmic Corsairs, both co-edited with Hank Davis, were released by Baen Books in 2020. The third book in the Sun Eater series, Demon in White, was released by DAW Books that same year. A Thor story he authored appeared in Avengers #750 in November 2021.

In 2025, following the completion of the Sun Eater series, Ruocchio announced The Doomsong Saga, a Mediterranean-inspired fantasy epic set in a Bronze Age–influenced world. Its first installment, The Godstained House, is scheduled for release in 2026. In 2026, Ruocchio announced that the book had been renamed to The Smoke of Sacrifice.

He is married and lives in Raleigh, North Carolina.

== Bibliography ==
=== Sun Eater ===
The series, a blend of space opera and epic fantasy, is set 20,000 years into our future.

1. Empire of Silence (July 2018, DAW Books, ISBN 978-0-7564-1300-2)
2. Howling Dark (July 2019, DAW Books, ISBN 978-0-7564-1303-3)
3. Demon in White (July 2020, DAW Books, ISBN 978-0-7564-1306-4)
4. Kingdoms of Death (March 2022, DAW Books, ISBN 978-0-7564-1309-5)
5. Ashes of Man (December 2022, DAW Books, ISBN 978-0-7564-1660-7)
6. Disquiet Gods (April 2024, Baen Books, ISBN 978-1982193324)
7. Shadows Upon Time (November 2025, DAW Books, ISBN 978-0756420017)

Other works set in this universe:

- The Lesser Devil (#1.5, novella, February 2020, Ruocchio Ventures, ISBN 979-861735413-5)
- Queen amid Ashes (#2.5, novella, December 2021, Baen Books, in Sword & Planet, ISBN 978-1982125783)
- Tales of the Sun Eater, Volume 1 (#2.6, short story collection, April 2021, Ruocchio Ventures, ASIN B092STL2NW)
- Tales of the Sun Eater, Volume 2 (#3.5, short story collection, June 2022, Ruocchio Ventures, ASIN B09X3BJ2LP)
- Tales of the Sun Eater, Volume 3 (#5.5, short story collection, September 2023, Ruocchio Ventures, ASIN B0CGVJS91D)
- The Dregs of Empire (#5.6, novel, November 2023, Ruocchio Ventures, ISBN 979-8871712597)
- Tales of the Sun Eater, Volume 4 (#5.7, short story collection, July 2025, Ruocchio Ventures, ASIN B0F83V8TZY)
- Songs of the Sun Eater (#7.5, short story collection, November 2026, DAW Books, ISBN 978-0756421502)

Short fiction in this universe

- "Not Made for Us" in Star Destroyers (March 2018)
- "The Parliament of Owls" in Space Pioneers (November 2018)
- "The Demons of Arae" in Parallel Worlds: The Heroes Within edited by L. J. Hachmeister and R.R. Virdi (October 2019, Source 7, ISBN 978-1-69839-186-1)
- "Kill the King" in The Dogs of God: Science Fiction According to Chris edited by Chris Kennedy (February 2020, Theogony Books, ISBN 978-1-950420-96-4)
- "Victim of Changes" in Overruled! (April 2020)
- "The Night Captain" in Cosmic Corsairs (August 2020)
- "Good Intentions" in Shapers of Worlds edited by Edward Willett (September 2020, Shadowpaw Press)

=== Adaman short stories ===
The Adaman short stories are inspired by Sword and Sorcery

- The Barrow King, published in Galaxy Science Fiction (August 2024)
- Shrine of the Lost Stars, available via Ruocchio's Patreon (September 2024)
- The Pilgrim Road, available via Ruocchio's Patreon (April 2025)

=== Other short fiction ===
- "The Two Worthies", a Thor story in Avengers #750 (November 2021, Marvel Comics, art by Steve McNiven)

=== As editor ===
- Star Destroyers, co-edited with Tony Daniel (March 2018, Baen Books, ISBN 978-1-4814-8309-4)
- Space Pioneers, co-edited with Hank Davis (November 2018, Baen Books, ISBN 978-1-4814-8360-5)
- Overruled!, co-edited with Hank Davis (April 2020, Baen Books, ISBN 978-1-982124-50-2)
- Cosmic Corsairs, co-edited with Hank Davis (August 2020, Baen Books, ISBN 978-1-982124-78-6)
- Sword & Planet (December 2021, Baen Books, ISBN 978-1-982125783)
- Time Troopers, co-edited with Hank Davis (April 2022, Baen Books, ISBN 978-1-982126-03-2)
- Worlds Long Lost, co-edited with Sean CW Korsgaard (December 2022, Baen Books, ISBN 978-1-982192303)

== Reception ==
Ruocchio's writing in his first novel, Empire of Silence, was described as "promising and ambitious", but with "occasionally heavy-handed detail" by Locus reviewer Carolyn Cushman. Rob H. Bedford of SFFWorld described it as "remarkably page-turning", and Ruocchio's writing as "nuanced at times, magnetic to the reader's eyes", going on to state that "the narration felt earned and genuine". Bedford compared the book to Frank Herbert's Dune, The Book of the New Sun by Gene Wolfe, and The Name of the Wind by Patrick Rothfuss, stating that "[t]his just might be the most impressive SFF debut novel of 2018". The novel garnered the 2019 Manly Wade Wellman Award for Ruocchio.

Barnes & Noble included Howling Dark as one of their best science fiction and fantasy books for July 2019, describing it as "space opera at its most riveting and grandiose". Publishers Weekly described Ruocchio's writing in Demon in White as having "seamless worldbuilding, thought-provoking science, and heart-pounding battles". Stephen Hubbard of Book Reporter described the writing as "exquisite...epic-level storytelling" and "a powerful tour de force that stands head and shoulders above its two deftly crafted predecessors". The reviewer also stated that "no one is delivering better science fiction than Christopher Ruocchio".

=== Awards and honors ===
Ruocchio has been nominated for the following awards.

| Year | Organization | Award title, category | Work | Result | Refs |
|---|---|---|---|---|---|
| 2019 | North Carolina Speculative Fiction Foundation | Manly Wade Wellman Award | Empire of Silence | Won | |
| 2020 | Dragon Con | Dragon Award, Best Military Science Fiction or Fantasy Novel | Howling Dark | Nominated | |
