= The Sun Eater =

Series of novels by Christopher Ruocchio

- Main novels: Empire of Silence (2018); Howling Dark (2019); Demon in White (2020); Kingdoms of Death (2022); Ashes of Man (2023); Disquiet Gods (2024); Shadows Upon Time (2025); Novellas: The Lesser Devil (2020); Queen Amid Ashes (2021); The Dregs of Empire (2023)
- Author: Christopher Ruocchio
- Illustrator: Sam Weber; Kieran Yanner; Dominic Harman
- Cover artist: Sam Weber (US, Book #1); Kieran Yanner (US, Books #2 to #7); Dominic Harman (UK)
- Country: United States
- Genre: Science fiction, Space opera, Science fantasy
- Publisher: United States: DAW Books; Baen Books (Disquiet Gods first hardback edition); United Kingdom: Gollancz (Books 1-3); Head of Zeus (Books 4-7)
- Published: July 3, 2018
- Media type: Print (hardback and paperback), audiobook, e-book
- No. of books: 7, 3 novellas

The Sun Eater is a high fantasy science fiction novel series written by American author Christopher Ruocchio. Not including short stories and novellas, the series consists of the following novels: Empire of Silence (2018), Howling Dark (2019), Demon in White (2020), Kingdoms of Death (2022), Ashes of Man (2022), Disquiet Gods (2024), and Shadows Upon Time (2025).

== Plot summary ==
The Sun Eater series is set in a distant future where humanity has colonized the stars and established a vast interstellar empire known as the Sollan Empire. The story is narrated by Hadrian Marlowe, who recounts his life as a reluctant hero and the events that led to his infamous title, "the Sun Eater."

== Writing ==
Ruocchio began writing novels in 2011 while at university. After signing with a publisher in 2016, he published Empire of Silence, the first book in the Sun Eater series. The fourth book was split into two separate books, Kingdoms of Death and Ashes of Man, to compensate for rising paper costs.

Ruocchio was influenced by classical literature and history, as well as authors like Frank Herbert and J. R. R. Tolkien.

== Reception ==
The series has received praise from critics for its scope, worldbuilding, storytelling and characterization. Rob H. Bedford, in a review for SFF World compared the first entry Empire of Silence to Herbert's Dune, Gene Wolfe's The Book of the New Sun and Patrick Rothfuss' The Name of the Wind. Stephen Hubbard of BookReporter commented that the writing quality and depth improved with later installments in the series.

Ruocchio has attributed a large increase in the series' popularity starting in 2023 – several years after first publication – to positive coverage by BookTube creators making it go viral within these circles. According to Ruocchio, this increased the demand for the series to the point of prompting DAW Books to issue reprints of the hardback edition, in a situation described by him as "unprecedented" for the publisher.

== Series overview ==
Main series
#	Title	Hardcover pages	Paperback pages	Chapters	Word Count (est.)	Audio Length	Original Publication date
1	Empire of Silence	612	624	78	237,000	26h 6m	July 3, 2018
2	Howling Dark	679	688	80	256,000	28h 3m	July 16, 2019
3	Demon in White	776	784	87	286,000	30h 41m	July 28, 2020
4	Kingdoms of Death	535	544	51	199,000	22h 50m	March 22, 2022
5	Ashes of Man	537	544	47	198,000	22h 34m	December 13, 2022
6	Disquiet Gods	690	704	68	284,000	31h 38m	April 2, 2024
7	Shadows Upon Time	919	944	91	371,000	44h 26m	November 18, 2025
Total		3,658	3,888	502	~1,831,000	206h 18m	2018–2025

Ruocchio has also published the novellas The Lesser Devil (2020), Queen Amid Ashes (2021), and The Dregs of Empire (2023), along with the short story collections Tales of the Sun Eater Vol. 1 (2021), Tales of the Sun Eater Vol. 2 (2022), Tales of the Sun Eater Vol. 3 (2023), and Tales of the Sun Eater Vol. 4 (2025). The novellas and short story collections are all self-published with only the novellas having audiobooks. The contents of all four short story collections will be traditionally published across two volumes by DAW Books in Songs of the Sun Eater (2026) and Sins of the Sun Eater (2027).
