= Call of Duty: Modern Warfare II (2022 video game) =

2022 video game

- Developer: Infinity Ward (Note: Treyarch developed the Ranked Play mode of the game. Additional development work by Sledgehammer Games, Raven Software, Toys for Bob, Beenox, Demonware, High Moon Studios, Activision Shanghai and Activision Central Tech.)
- Publisher: Activision
- Artists: Joel Emslie; Riccard Linde
- Writers: Brian Bloom; Eric Anderson; Justin Harris
- Composer: Sarah Schachner (Note: Additional music for post-launch seasons composed by Jason Graves, Steve Ouimette, Nainita Desai, Toby Chu, Photek, Finneas O'Connell and David Marinelli, and Tyler Bates)
- Series: Call of Duty
- Engine: IW 9.0
- Platforms: PlayStation 4; PlayStation 5; Windows; Xbox One; Xbox Series X/S
- Release: October 28, 2022 (Note: Those who digitally pre-ordered Modern Warfare II were able to play the game's campaign mode from October 20, 2022.)
- Genre: First-person shooter
- Modes: Single-player, multiplayer

Call of Duty: Modern Warfare II is a 2022 first-person shooter game developed by Infinity Ward and published by Activision. It is the nineteenth installment of the Call of Duty series, serving as a sequel to the 2019 reboot of the Modern Warfare sub-series. The game was released on October 28, 2022, for PlayStation 4, PlayStation 5, Windows, Xbox One, and Xbox Series X/S.

Like its predecessor, the game takes place in a realistic and modern setting. The campaign follows multi-national special operations unit Task Force 141 and Mexican Special Forces unit Los Vaqueros as they attempt to track down terrorist leader Hassan Zyani, who is in possession of American-made ballistic missiles. Powered by a new version of the IW engine, Modern Warfare II continues to support cross-platform multiplayer and also features a free-to-play battle royale mode, Warzone 2.0, a follow-up to the original Warzone, all within a single cross-game launcher, known as Call of Duty HQ.

Modern Warfare II received generally favorable reviews from critics. It was a commercial success and broke several records for the series, including becoming the fastest Call of Duty game to generate US$1 billion in revenue. A sequel, titled Modern Warfare III, was released on November 10, 2023.

== Gameplay ==
Modern Warfare II introduces several design improvements and changes to the series gameplay, such as advanced AI systems in the campaign and co-op modes, water physics, swimming mechanics, and an overhauled vehicle system. New gameplay features and movement tactics include dive to prone, mantle, and ledge hang along with the removal of slide canceling. New vehicle gameplay features include leaning out of vehicle windows, mantling onto a vehicle roof, and hijacking. The levelling and Gunsmith system has been revamped, allowing players to fine-tune specific attachments to suit their playstyles. It also offers weapon platforms that branch progression to reduce repetitiveness, as well as featuring a firing range for practice.

Modern Warfare II's multiplayer component features several new game modes: Knockout, in which two teams attempt to capture a package with limited lives; and Prisoner Rescue, in which an attacking team attempts to extract a hostage while a defending team prevents them by fortifying defenses around the hostage. Third-person game modes were confirmed in September 2022. The cooperative Special Ops mode also returns, featuring two-player missions. "Raids", an additional 3-player activity, was added to Special Ops post-launch. Additional multiplayer modes were also released as part of post-launch seasons, including the 2v2 "Gunfight" mode, which was previously featured in Modern Warfare (2019) and Call of Duty: Black Ops Cold War (2020).

Like the previous game, Modern Warfare II features a free-to-play battle royale game mode called Warzone 2.0, which is introduced with the first seasonal content update for the game on November 16. In addition to the traditional battle royale mode, Warzone 2.0 also introduces DMZ, a new extraction game mode in which teams of trios battle against each other as well as AI combatants, while attempting to complete missions and extract loot from the playable map. Warzone 2.0 would later be shortened to Warzone during Season 4.

== Synopsis ==
=== Characters and settings ===
Modern Warfare II is a continuation of the 2019 reboot entry, with the campaign taking place in late 2022. The game takes place in both real and fictional locations, such as the fictional Mexican city of Las Almas, Amsterdam, the Mexico–United States border, Gulf of Mexico, Chicago, Urzikstan, and the new United Republic of Adal (URA), the capital of which, Al Mazrah, serves as a major locale within the campaign and multiplayer modes, as well as the new map for the free-to-play Warzone 2.0. The game's plot is partly based on real-life events, such as the assassination of Qasem Soleimani.

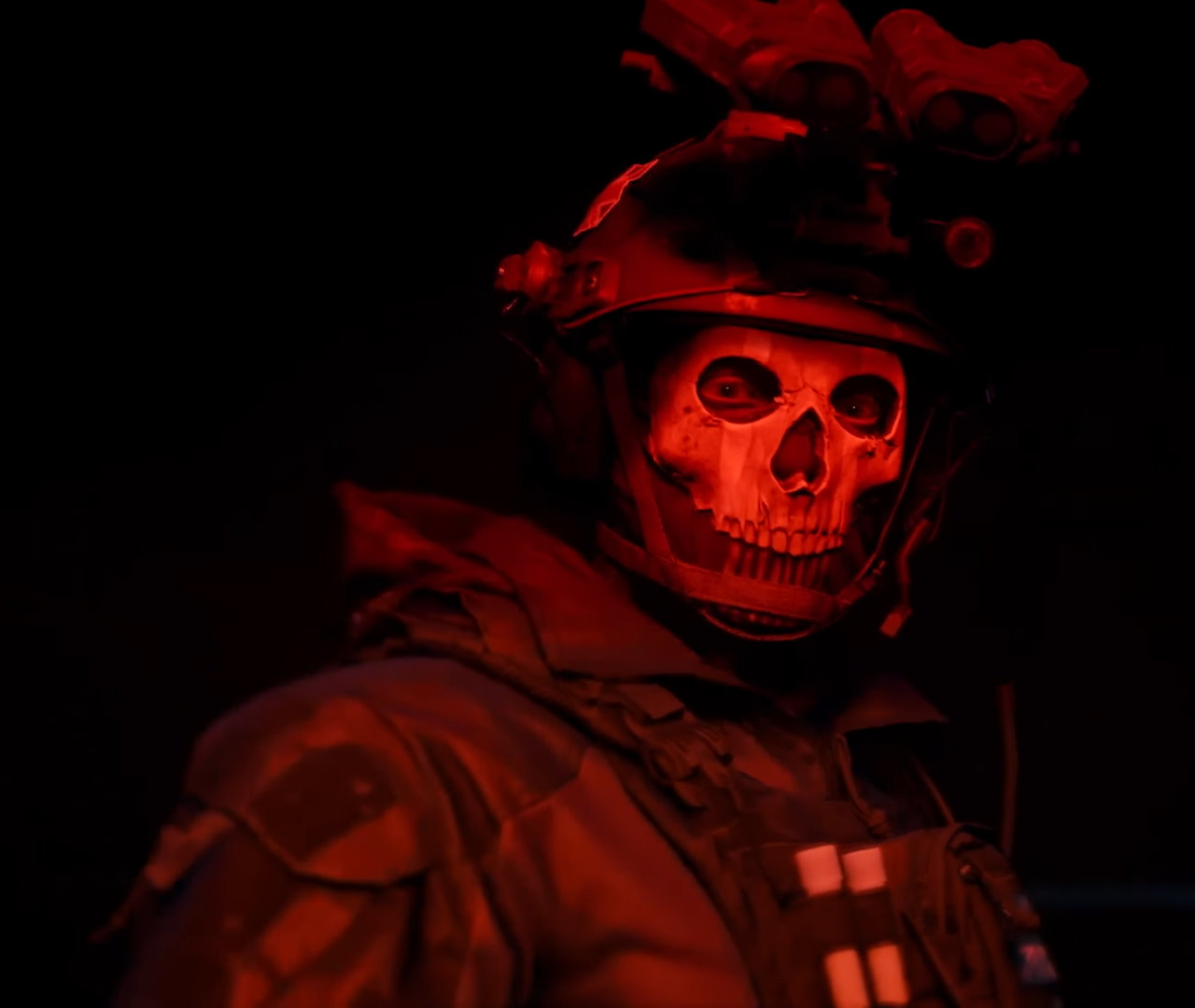
Simon "Ghost" Riley in a helicopter wearing his signature mask

The central protagonists of the game are Task Force 141, a multi-national special operations unit formed by SAS Captain John Price (Barry Sloane), comprising: Sergeant Kyle "Gaz" Garrick (Elliot Knight), Lieutenant Simon "Ghost" Riley (Samuel Roukin), and Sergeant John "Soap" MacTavish (Neil Ellice). Throughout the course of the story, Task Force 141 is supported by several allies: CIA Station Chief Kate Laswell (Rya Kihlstedt), Russian private military company leader "Nikolai" (Stefan Kapičić), Urzikstan Liberation Force Commander Farah Karim (Claudia Doumit), Mexican Special Forces Colonel Alejandro Vargas (Alain Mesa) and Sergeant Major Rodolfo Parra (Bayardo De Murguia), Shadow Company PMC Commander Phillip Graves (Warren Kole), and United States Army General Herschel Shepherd (Glenn Morshower). The primary antagonist of Modern Warfare II is Major Hassan Zyani (Ibrahim Renno), an Iranian Quds Force officer who is allied with the Urzik terrorist organization Al-Qatala, and is supported by the Mexican Las Almas Cartel. The cartel operates under the leadership of sicaria Valeria Garza (María Elisa Camargo), who uses the alias "El Sin Nombre" (lit. The Nameless One).

The Special Ops and Multiplayer post-launch story takes place after the campaign, and features a cast of multi-national operators working under two major factions, SpecGru and KorTac Group, both of which are private military companies. Both factions undertake new covert operations, overseen by Laswell, taking place within the vicinity of Al Mazrah; the operations later expand to the Asia-Pacific island Ashika and the city of Vondel, Netherlands. Notable characters who appear in the post-launch story include: Daniel "Ronin" Shinoda (Thomas Bromhead), an ex-Special Forces fighter; Alex Keller (Chad Michael Collins), a former CIA officer who joined Farah's army; Hadir Karim (Aidan Bristow), Farah's brother who defected and became an Al-Qatala commander; Nikto (Gideon Emery), a former FSB deep cover agent; Vladimir Makarov (Julian Kostov), the Ultranationalist commander of the Russian PMC Konni Group; and Andrei Nolan (Nikolai Nikolaeff) and Ivan Alexxeve (Lev Gorn), Konni operatives working for Makarov.

=== Plot ===
==== Campaign ====
In July 2022, Task Force 141, under the command of General Herschel Shepherd, conducts a surgical missile strike against Russian-backed Iranian forces, assassinating Iranian General Ghorbrani during an arms deal in Al Mazrah. In October, Ghorbrani's lieutenant, Quds Force Major Hassan Zyani, becomes involved in funding terrorist activity and seeks revenge on the United States. Hassan's activities draw the attention of Shepherd and CIA Station Chief Kate Laswell, who order Marine Raiders, led by Task Force 141 operatives Lieutenant Simon "Ghost" Riley and Sergeant John "Soap" MacTavish, to apprehend Hassan in Al Mazrah. Ghost and Soap fail to capture Hassan, but discover that he was in possession of an American ballistic missile.

Laswell and Task Force 141 operatives Captain John Price and Sergeant Kyle "Gaz" Garrick pursue one of Hassan's couriers in Amsterdam, learning that Hassan has received protection from and has allied with the Las Almas Cartel, and is currently in Mexico. After a failed attempt to apprehend him at the Mexico–US border, Mexican Special Forces Colonel Alejandro Vargas and his second-in-command Sergeant Major Rodolfo Parra, alongside their unit Los Vaqueros, participate in a joint operation with Ghost, Soap, and Shadow Company, a PMC under the direct command of Shepherd and led by its CEO, Phillip Graves, to capture Hassan. Although successful, they are forced to release him to avoid political fallout with Iran despite evidence of his crimes.

Data hacked from Hassan's phone leads Price, Laswell, and Gaz to Cape Vilan, where they discover that Las Almas possessed Russian-made GPS devices for missiles. When Laswell is captured by Urzik terrorist group Al-Qatala, Price and Gaz track down and save her in Urzikstan, with the aid of their old allies Nikolai and Farah Karim. Meanwhile, Alejandro and Soap manage to capture Las Almas' leader, "El Sin Nombre", revealed to be Alejandro's former special forces comrade Valeria Garza. Valeria reveals that one of the missiles is on an oil rig in the Gulf of Mexico, prompting a raid led by Task Force 141, Shadow Company and Alejandro to prevent its launch. Despite the successful mission, Graves and Shadow Company betray Alejandro and Task Force 141 under Shepherd's orders. Graves captures Alejandro and seizes Los Vaqueros' base of operations, while Ghost and Soap flee into Las Almas as Shadow Company viciously slaughters its residents in search of Hassan. With help from Rodolfo, Laswell, Price, and Gaz, Ghost and Soap free Alejandro and Los Vaqueros.

Laswell reveals that Shepherd and Graves were responsible for an illegal missile transportation mission in August meant to aid American allies in the Middle East. The transport was ambushed by a Russian PMC known as the Konni Group, with the three ballistic missiles being stolen, forcing Shepherd to cover up the mission's failure. Price confronts Shepherd over the revelations, promising to pursue him when the current threat is eliminated. Task Force 141 and Los Vaqueros succeed in retaking the latter's base and seemingly killing Graves, while also learning from Valeria that Hassan is in Chicago. The team narrowly thwarts Hassan's plan, detonating his missile en route to the Pentagon; Ghost manages to assassinate him as he attempts to kill Soap. In the aftermath, Shepherd has gone into hiding, while Laswell informs 141 of the new leader of the Russian Ultranationalists responsible for Shepherd's botched operation, whom Price identifies as Vladimir Makarov.

In a mid-credits scene, a Russian terrorist cell prepares to hijack a plane. They receive a text from Makarov, who tells them not to speak Russian during the hijacking.

==== Special Ops ====
Some time after Hassan's death, Laswell starts to oversee new covert operations in Al Mazrah, in an effort to further undermine Al-Qatala activities.

In December 2022, Laswell tasks Price, Gaz, and Farah with investigating the disappearance of former CIA officer Alex Keller, who was sent by Farah alongside several ULF fighters to infiltrate a recently discovered Soviet-era bunker in the Sattiq mountains in Urzikstan. They learn that the bunker houses a Soviet-made thermonuclear missile, while Farah's fighters were killed by Al-Qatala forces. The team heads further into the bunker and finds Alex alive, though the missile warheads were stolen. Alex reveals that Farah's brother, Hadir, has been acting as Al-Qatala's commander, and he left Alex alive to deliver a message: join him in his mission, or leave him be.

As Gaz leaves the facility to relay the information to Laswell, Price and Farah, joined by Alex, pursue Hadir by going further down the bunker, but they are forced to stand down as Hadir and his men surround them. Hadir orders his men to lock up the trio in jail cells, but they manage to escape captivity and resume their pursuit. After securing the core of the Soviet warhead, Price, Farah, and Alex catch up to Hadir and find him trying to escape from the bunker via an elevator; the trio is forced to sabotage the elevator's mechanism in order to stop him. After bringing down the elevator, Price, Farah, and Alex confront a mortally wounded Hadir. Before dying, Hadir tries to persuade Farah to make use of the warhead, warning her that Urzikstan is in danger and that "the real Russians" are coming for them, but he succumbs to his wounds before he can give a name. Afterwards, Price and Gaz exfiltrate from the bunker via helicopter, while Farah, Alex, and the ULF move to dispose of the warhead.

==== Multiplayer/Warzone ====
In late 2022, several private military companies begin to move into Al Mazrah, looking to wrestle control of the city from AQ forces as well as each other. At some point, Shadow Company was discovered to be running new operations in Al Mazrah, as well as the Asia-Pacific island Ashika and the elusive underground facility Building 21.

In April 2023, Valeria manages to escape captivity in Las Almas and rallies the Las Almas Cartel to conduct activities in Al Mazrah. Alejandro is recruited by Laswell to thwart the cartel's plans and apprehend Valeria. Later that year, a terrorist attack occurs in the city of Vondel, Netherlands. As its citizens are evacuated, a mysterious special forces group, called the Peacekeepers, moves in and seizes control of the city. Laswell establishes partnership with the Black Mous PMC to investigate the Peacekeepers while working to free Vondel from their grasps. They soon learn that the Peacekeepers are actually the Russian PMC Konni Group in disguise, and the attack on Vondel was orchestrated by them.

In August, Graves, who is revealed to have faked his death, meets with Farah and Alex, and proposes an alliance between Shadow Company and the ULF, as they prepare for an invasion on Al Mazrah from the Konni Group. Under Shepherd's command, Graves leads an assault on the Konni-occupied Zaya Observatory in Al Mazrah as part of Operation: Rogue Arsenal. After destroying the observatory with missile launchers, Shadow Company locates an underground weapons facility containing chemical weaponry and begin extracting gas canisters, but are forced to exfil when the tunnels begin collapsing. However, Konni operatives masquerading as Shadow soldiers manage to infiltrate their ranks and hijack the planes carrying the gas shipment, rendering the operation a failure.

== Development ==
Modern Warfare II was developed by Infinity Ward alongside a new version of the battle royale title Call of Duty: Warzone, later revealed to be titled Warzone 2.0, with both games using a new version of the IW engine, under a single cross-game launcher known as Call of Duty HQ, which would be later known as the Call of Duty launcher. The new upgraded engine features a physically based material system, a new hybrid tile-based streaming system, a new PBR decal rendering system, world volumetric lighting, 4K HDR, as well as a new GPU geometry pipeline. The game features Activision's proprietary Ricochet Anti-Cheat at launch.

=== Music ===
Sarah Schachner composed the score for Modern Warfare II, after previously composing the music for the 2019 reboot and Call of Duty: Infinite Warfare (2016). In November 2022, Schachner stepped away from writing further music for the game, citing challenges in the working dynamic with Infinity Ward's audio director as the reason for her departure. In a statement released by her on X, she noted that the contents of the official soundtrack release for Modern Warfare II were "not my artistic intent in regards to mixing and mastering".

The soundtrack for Modern Warfare II was released digitally on November 25, 2022, featuring 23 tracks from the game's original score and two songs from artists Edison Flood, Destani Wolf, and Banda MS de Sergio Lizárraga. Additional music was written for Modern Warfare II's post-launch seasons, in collaboration with Jason Graves (Warzone), Steve Ouimette (season 2), Nainita Desai (season 3), Toby Chu (season 4), Photek (season 5), Finneas O'Connell and David Marinelli (Gunfight mode's theme), and Tyler Bates (season 6).

=== Canceled expansion pack ===
In February 2022, Bloomberg News's Jason Schreier reported that Activision was intending to, for the first time in nearly two decades, deviate from Call of Duty's annual release cycle, with the publisher opting to delay Treyarch's next mainline Call of Duty project from a 2023 release to 2024, following the disappointing commercial performance of Call of Duty: Vanguard (2021). To help fill the gap between releases, Activision planned to ship an expansion pack for Modern Warfare II in late 2023, assigning Sledgehammer Games to lead the production of the project. The expansion was intended to feature a new single-player campaign—which was planned to be set in Mexico—along with new content for Modern Warfare II's multiplayer component. By Summer 2022, however, Activision chose to shift the project's direction, turning it into a direct, fully-fledged sequel to Modern Warfare II, titled Modern Warfare III.

In July 2023, following a series of leaks—reported to have emerged from an internal alpha build of Modern Warfare III—Activision confirmed that all Modern Warfare II operators, weapons, and cosmetic bundles would be available to use in Modern Warfare III.

== Marketing ==
=== Reveal ===
In February 2022, Activision confirmed that a sequel to Call of Duty: Modern Warfare would be released later that year, alongside a new iteration of Call of Duty: Warzone. The game's title, Modern Warfare II, was revealed in April 2022. A month later, Activision released another teaser, which featured the key arts of the main characters of the game, as well as a release date of October 28, 2022. On June 2, 2022, a live-action trailer was released, on the same day, Steam responded to a tweet from the official Call of Duty X account, strongly suggesting the game would be released on Microsoft Windows via the Steam platform, in addition to Battle.net. The first trailer for the game was released on June 8, showcasing gameplay from the campaign mode, as well as confirming the game's release on Steam, Battle.net, and the eighth and ninth generation consoles. Modern Warfare II marks the first time since 2017's Call of Duty: WWII that a Call of Duty title released on the Steam platform. In September 2022, Activision held the "Call of Duty Next" showcase where they revealed a multiplayer gameplay trailer, details on the Spec Ops mode, Call of Duty: Warzone 2.0, and the DMZ extraction game mode.

=== Release ===
The multiplayer beta for Modern Warfare II started for PlayStation 4 and PlayStation 5 players on September 16, and for Windows, Xbox One, and Xbox Series X/S players on September 22. The beta officially ended on September 26 at 3pm EDT across all platforms before the launch on October 28, 2022. Pre-orders of all editions grant "early" access to the open multiplayer beta. The Vault Edition grants access to a "Red Team 141" operator pack, a "FJX Cinder Weapon Vault" pack, plus access to the Battle Pass of a Season for Modern Warfare II (dependent on the time of purchase), and double XP tokens. In addition, the Vault Edition also included the "Ghost Legacy Pack", which granted 12 Ghost operator skins and 10 weapon blueprints for the M4A1 assault rifle for use in Modern Warfare (2019) and Call of Duty: Warzone. Unlike the previous cross-gen titles, Modern Warfare II offers no standard editions for the eighth-generation consoles, but only a cross-gen edition for all platforms, in addition to the Vault Edition. Pre-ordering also granted early access to the campaign a week earlier on October 20. The game became available on Xbox Game Pass on May 1st, 2025, across Game Pass Ultimate, Game Pass Premium, PC Game Pass tiers.

=== Post-launch content ===
Similar to the previous titles, Modern Warfare II employs both the battle pass system and an in-game store where players can purchase cosmetic bundles using the "COD Points" microtransaction currency, while free content, such as new maps and weapons, are provided on a regular basis with "Season" updates.

In addition, Activision also partners with celebrities and other media franchises to feature licensed characters in the multiplayer component and Warzone 2.0. Notable additions to the playable roster include: football players Paul Pogba, Neymar, and Lionel Messi; Shredder from the Teenage Mutant Ninja Turtles franchise; basketball player Kevin Durant; online streamers Nickmercs and TimTheTatman; (Note: Nickmercs' bundle was removed from the game a week after its release due to an anti-LGBT comment he made on Twitter. TimTheTatman's bundle was also removed some time later at his request to support Nickmercs' stance, though purchases of both bundles prior to their removals are honored.) Starlight, Homelander, and Black Noir from Amazon Prime Video's The Boys TV series; rappers Snoop Dogg, Nicki Minaj, and 21 Savage; Lara Croft from the Tomb Raider franchise; Spawn from the comic book series of the same name; Skeletor from the Masters of the Universe franchise; Ash Williams from the Evil Dead franchise; Alucard from the Hellsing manga and anime series; Lilith and Inarius from Blizzard Entertainment's Diablo IV; and the Sardaukar from the film Dune and its sequel Dune: Part Two. Additional themed cosmetic items were also released, based on the Crash Bandicoot and Doom franchises.

== Reception ==
Reception

Aggregate score
Aggregator	Score
Metacritic	PC: 79/100; PS5: 75/100; XSXS: 77/100

Review scores
Publication	Score
Destructoid	8/10
Game Informer	6.5/10
GameSpot	SP: 8/10; MP: 7/10
GamesRadar+	4/5
IGN	SP: 6/10; MP: 8/10
PC Gamer (US)	83/100
PCGamesN	6/10
Push Square	8/10
Shacknews	6/10
The Telegraph	3/5
The Guardian	4/5
VentureBeat	4.5/5
VG247	4/5

Call of Duty: Modern Warfare II received "generally favorable" reviews, according to review aggregator website Metacritic.

Reid McCarter of Game Informer awarded the game a 6.5/10, concluding that while the game's depiction of warfare remained unsettling, its strong multiplayer and occasional highlights in the campaign were enough to make it enjoyable overall. Jordan Forward of PCGamesN gave it a 6/10, criticizing its lack of content and weaker foundation compared to previous entries, though he praised its core gunplay and described it as an enjoyable, if diluted, successor to 2019's Modern Warfare. Keith Stuart of The Guardian described the game as "a precisely tooled, intensely immersive combat simulator", while acknowledging the moral discomfort of its realistic depiction of modern warfare.

The campaign received a more divided response, with several critics considering it a step back from its 2019 predecessor. Matt Purslow of IGN scored the campaign 6/10, calling it "a lackluster follow-up to its refined predecessor, saved by its best-in-class shooting." In contrast, S. E. Doster of GameSpot praised the campaign as "a greatest hits list" for the series, highlighting its mission variety, diverse locations, and greater player freedom.

The multiplayer was generally received more positively. Seth G. Macy of IGN praised it for retaining the series' familiar formula while introducing enough changes to feel distinct, calling it his favorite Call of Duty multiplayer experience in several years. Doster was more reserved, criticizing the overly complex Gunsmith customization system and describing the multiplayer as feeling somewhat lacking overall.

=== Sales ===
Call of Duty: Modern Warfare II became the fastest-selling Call of Duty game of all time. The game earned US$800 million in revenue in its first three days of release, and US$1 billion within 10 days, surpassing the series previous record-holders, 2011's Call of Duty: Modern Warfare 3 and 2012's Black Ops II. It was the best-selling game of the US in 2022.

In the United Kingdom, Modern Warfare II became the best-selling game in its first week of release. In Japan, the PlayStation 4 version of Call of Duty: Modern Warfare II sold 24,371 physical copies within its release week, making it the second bestselling retail game of the week in the country. The PlayStation 5 version sold 17,710 physical copies in Japan throughout the same week, placing it at number six on the all-format video games sales chart.

=== Awards ===
Year	Award	Category	Result	Ref.
2022	The Game Awards 2022	Best Audio Design	Nominated	
2022	The Game Awards 2022	Best Action Game	Nominated	
2022	The Game Awards 2022	Best Multiplayer	Nominated	
2023	The Steam Awards	Game of the Year	Nominated	
2023	The Steam Awards	Better with Friends	Nominated	
2023	19th BAFTA Games Awards	Animation	Nominated	
2023	19th BAFTA Games Awards	Multiplayer	Nominated	
2023	19th BAFTA Games Awards	Performer in a Leading Role: Alain Mesa as Alejandro Vargas	Nominated	
2023	26th Annual D.I.C.E. Awards	Online Game of The Year: Geoff Smith, Joe Cecot, Mitch Sanborne	Nominated	
2023	26th Annual D.I.C.E. Awards	Outstanding Achievement in Art Direction: Joel Emslie	Nominated	
2023	26th Annual D.I.C.E. Awards	Outstanding Achievement in Audio Design: Stephen Miller, Stuart Provine, Tim Stasica, Dave Rowe, Dave Natale	Nominated	
2023	26th Annual D.I.C.E. Awards	Outstanding Achievement in Character (Alejandro Vargas) - written by Jeffrey Negus, Brian Bloom, and Justin Harris; portrayed by Alain Mesa	Nominated	
2023	MPSE Golden Reel Awards 2023	Outstanding Achievement in Sound Editing – Game Dialogue / ADR	Nominated	
2023	MPSE Golden Reel Awards 2023	Outstanding Achievement in Music Editing – Game Music	Nominated	
2023	MPSE Golden Reel Awards 2023	Outstanding Achievement in Sound Editing – Game Effects / Foley	Nominated	
2023	NAVGTR Awards 2023	Outstanding Animation, Artistic	Nominated	
2023	NAVGTR Awards 2023	Outstanding Game, Franchise Action	Won	
2023	NAVGTR Awards 2023	Outstanding Original Dramatic Score, Franchise	Nominated	
2023	NAVGTR Awards 2023	Outstanding Use of Sound, Franchise	Nominated	
2024	66th Annual Grammy Awards	Best Score Soundtrack for Video Games and Other Interactive Media	Nominated	

== Sequel ==
A sequel to Modern Warfare II, titled Modern Warfare III, was released on November 10, 2023.
