= Call of Duty: Warzone (2022 video game) =

2022 video game

- Developers: Infinity Ward; Raven Software (Note: Ranked Play mode developed by Treyarch. Additional development work by Beenox, High Moon Studios, Sledgehammer Games, Toys for Bob and Activision Shanghai.)
- Publisher: Activision
- Series: Call of Duty
- Engine: IW 9.0
- Platforms: Nintendo Switch 2; PlayStation 4 (Note: Support for PlayStation 4 and Xbox One platforms ended on November 6, 2026, with the game being delisted from the aforementioned platforms on said date.); PlayStation 5; Windows; Xbox One; Xbox Series X/S
- Release: PlayStation 4, PlayStation 5, Windows, Xbox One, Xbox Series X/S; November 16, 2022; Nintendo Switch 2; November 6, 2026
- Genres: First-person shooter, Battle royale, Extraction shooter (DMZ)
- Mode: Multiplayer

Call of Duty: Warzone (Note: Also known as Call of Duty: Warzone 2.0, prior to the Modern Warfare II Season 4 update) is a 2022 free-to-play first-person shooter game developed by Infinity Ward and Raven Software for PlayStation 4, PlayStation 5, Windows, Xbox One, and Xbox Series X/S as part of the Call of Duty video game series. It is a successor to 2020's Call of Duty: Warzone. The game serves as a companion to various premium Call of Duty titles, starting with 2022's Call of Duty: Modern Warfare II, up to the latest title being 2026's Call of Duty: Modern Warfare 4. Warzone itself is free to download and does not require purchase of any of the parent titles. It was introduced during Season 1 of Modern Warfare II content. The game features cross-platform play.

Warzone was officially revealed by Activision at the "Call of Duty Next" event in September 2022, and was released on November 16, 2022 as part of a single cross-game launcher known as Call of Duty HQ, which would later be known as the Call of Duty launcher.

== Overview ==
Similar to its predecessor, in Warzone's primary game mode, Battle Royale, players compete in a continuously shrinking map to be the last player(s) remaining. Players parachute onto a large game map, where they encounter and eliminate other players. Players start with 150 health with two armor plates attached for an additional 100 health. As the game progresses and players are eliminated, the playable area shrinks, forcing the remaining players into tighter spaces. A new feature in Warzone, Circle Collapse, allows multiple circles to spawn within the map, which close independently of one another, before converging into one single safe zone. Like the 2020 version of Warzone, upon death, players are sent to the "Gulag", a small-sized arena where killed players battle one another for a chance at respawning into the map. In Warzone, Gulag matches were initially introduced in 2v2 format, and included an AI combatant called "the Jailer", whom players can hunt down to acquire a key and escape, in addition to the traditional method of winning Gulag matches. This change was reverted for Season 2 to the original 1v1 format, while the Jailer is also removed in favor of the overtime point capture system. In-game cash currencies also return, allowing players to buy various items at several buy stations scattered across the map, including custom loadouts with personalized weapons and perk setups. Warzone features many vehicles such as the ATV, cargo truck, Hatchback, SUV and many more.

During the match, events can happen throughout the game. There are three different types of events: Jailbreak (every player in the gulag is redeployed into the map and back into the game); Fire Sale (items in the buy station are discounted up to 100% for one minute); and Restock (supply boxes are refilled and can be opened again). Only one of these events can happen in a single game.

A new extraction game mode, named DMZ, was also featured at the release of Warzone. In DMZ, players battle against both AI-controlled and player-controlled opponents while attempting to exfil with loot they found within the playable area (also known as the Exclusion Zone). Players start out with a limited inventory, which allows storage of extracted loot from matches; said inventory can be expanded by completing Faction missions, allowing for more guaranteed loadout weapon slots or the opportunity to unlock base weapons and cosmetic rewards, usable in both Warzone and Modern Warfare II.

At launch, AI combatants were a prominent feature in Warzone, as they defended various strongholds and black sites throughout the main map, in both Battle Royale and DMZ. Players were able to engage in combat with the AI-controlled enemies in order to seize the strongholds and gain access to the loot items within. Following numerous balancing updates and changes, AI combatants were completely removed from Battle Royale modes in Modern Warfare II Season 4.

In Modern Warfare II Season 2, Warzone featured the return of Resurgence, a game mode in which player combatants can respawn and rejoin matches after being killed, provided that at least one member in their squad remains alive following a short cooldown period. Squad members can help reduce the cooldown period by completing contracts or killing other players.

Modern Warfare II Season 3 reintroduced the game mode Plunder, in which teams have to search for stacks of Cash scattered around the map to accumulate $2 million. Once found or if time is almost up, the game goes into overtime, multiplying all Cash sums twice. The team who has gathered the most money when the clock runs out is declared the winner. Players respawn automatically in this game mode. In addition, for the first time, a Ranked competitive mode was introduced in Warzone, developed in partnership with Treyarch using the official World Series of Warzone ruleset.

During the Black Ops 6 seasons, a new subset of "Casual" game modes was added to Warzone. Separate from the standard Battle Royale and Resurgence modes, Casual modes allow a mixture of real players and AI-controlled bots to play together in a match, serving as a starting point for new or returning players wanting an easier experience. The Black Ops 7 seasons introduced "Black Ops Royale", a new Battle Royale mode that takes inspiration from the Blackout mode of Call of Duty: Black Ops 4 (2018), incorporating elements of that mode into Warzone, such as scavenging attachment kits to upgrade weapons and using consumable perk items, rather than acquiring a fixed loadout.

In addition to shared progression with Modern Warfare II, Modern Warfare III, Black Ops 6, Black Ops 7, and Modern Warfare 4, Warzone also featured shared cross-platform progression and social aspects with Warzone Mobile, a new Warzone title made exclusively for mobile devices.

== Announcement and release ==
Call of Duty: Warzone was announced to the public by Activision in September 2022, initially under the name Call of Duty: Warzone 2.0. A new map was announced, described by the developers themselves to be "immense, dynamic and rewarding, and built literally from the ground up with the emphasis on loading up your favorite custom weapon, dropping in, exploring the vast landscape, and having a hell of a good time doing it." Warzone 2.0 was officially released on November 16, 2022 to all platforms.

On November 21, 2022, the official Call of Duty Twitter account stated that over 25 million players played Warzone 2.0 during the first five days of release. In that same month, the peak users playing all at once was close to 500,000 players on Steam alone.

Microsoft released Warzone on Xbox Cloud Gaming for Game Pass Ultimate members on October 25, 2024, the same day as Call of Duty: Black Ops 6.

Following the announcement of Call of Duty: Modern Warfare 4, Activision announced that Warzone would be released on the Nintendo Switch 2, starting with the release of Modern Warfare 4's first seasonal update on November 6, 2026. Additionally, Activision also announced that as part of this update, Warzone would no longer be supported on the PlayStation 4 and Xbox One platforms. Said platforms were no longer able to download the game as of June 4, 2026.

== Reception ==
Reception

Aggregate score
Aggregator	Score
Metacritic	PC: 80/100; PS5: 79/100

Review scores
Publication	Score
GameSpot	8/10
GamesRadar+	4/5
Jeuxvideo.com	17/20
NME	4/5
PC Gamer (US)	80/100
IGN Italia	8.4/10

Call of Duty: Warzone (2022) received "generally favorable" reviews, according to review aggregator platform Metacritic. GameSpot gave the game a 8/10 rating. Critic S.E. Doster, argues that the game has made positive improvements to the franchise in some areas, but has compromised some of the more traditional elements of the game in other aspects.GamesRadar+ gave the game an equivalent score of 4 out of 5 stars. Reviewer Josh West, highlights how Warzone 2.0 boosts the Battle Royale genre by adding real time Proximity Chat to the gameplay, enhancing the overall experience.IGN also gave the game a 8/10 review score. According to IGN writer Stella Chung, a new addition to Warzone 2.0 that makes it more unique than other Battle Royale games is the ability to recruit enemy players to your team. This feature not only innovates within the genre but also encourages a mix of diplomatic and strategic gameplay that is rarely seen in Battle Royale.

Although not considered a mainline title in the Call of Duty franchise, Sam Loveridge of GamesRadar+ ranked Warzone 2.0 as the sixth best game in the series in 2024, citing it as a "distinctive" take on the battle royale genre that "streamlines the loot system, adds an ingenious way to rejoin the fight in the Gulag, and slices through the somewhat monotonous world of battle royales with a dang tac knife."
