= Call of Duty DS =

Call of Duty DS may refer to:

- Call of Duty 4: Modern Warfare (Nintendo DS)
- Call of Duty: World at War (Nintendo DS)
- Call of Duty: Modern Warfare: Mobilized
- Call of Duty: Black Ops (Nintendo DS)
- Call of Duty: Modern Warfare 3 – Defiance
