= List of Activision games: 2010–2019 =

The following List of Activision games: 2010–2019 is a portion of the List of Activision video games.

Title	Platform(s)	Release date	Developer(s)	Ref.
Percy Jackson and The Olympians: The Lightning Thief	Nintendo DS	February 9, 2010	Griptonite	
ZhuZhu Pets	Nintendo DS	March 21, 2010	Black Lantern Studios	
Build-A-Bear Workshop: Friendship Valley	Wii	March 23, 2010	Neko Entertainment	
Build-A-Bear Workshop: Welcome to Hugsville	Nintendo DS	March 23, 2010	Pastagames	
How to Train Your Dragon	Nintendo DS	March 23, 2010	Griptonite	
How to Train Your Dragon	PlayStation 3	March 23, 2010	Étranges Libellules	
How to Train Your Dragon	Wii	March 23, 2010	Étranges Libellules	
How to Train Your Dragon	Xbox 360	March 23, 2010	Étranges Libellules	
Bakugan: Battle Trainer	Nintendo DS	March 30, 2010	Magic Pockets	
Geometry Wars: Retro Evolved 2	iOS	April 1, 2010	Bizarre Creations	
Tony Hawk's Pro Skater 2	iOS	April 1, 2010	LTI Gray Matter	
Shrek Forever After: The Final Chapter	Microsoft Windows	May 19, 2010	XPEC Entertainment	
Shrek Forever After: The Final Chapter	Wii	May 19, 2010	XPEC Entertainment	
Shrek Forever After: The Final Chapter	PlayStation 3	May 19, 2010	XPEC Entertainment	
Shrek Forever After: The Final Chapter	Xbox 360	May 19, 2010	XPEC Entertainment	
Transformers: Cybertron Adventures	Wii	May 22, 2010	Next Level Games	
Blur	Microsoft Windows	May 25, 2010	Spiral House	
Blur	PlayStation 3	May 25, 2010	Bizarre Creations / Agora Games	
Blur	Xbox 360	May 25, 2010	Bizarre Creations / Agora Games	
Crash Bandicoot Nitro Kart 2	iOS	May 27, 2010	Polarbit	
Shrek Forever After: The Final Chapter	Nintendo DS	June 18, 2010	Griptonite	
Transformers: War for Cybertron	Microsoft Windows	June 22, 2010	High Moon Studios	
Transformers: War for Cybertron	PlayStation 3	June 22, 2010	High Moon Studios	
Transformers: War for Cybertron	Xbox 360	June 22, 2010	High Moon Studios	
Transformers: War for Cybertron - Autobots	Nintendo DS	June 22, 2010	Vicarious Visions	
Transformers: War for Cybertron - Decepticons	Nintendo DS	June 22, 2010	Vicarious Visions	
Wipeout: The Game	Wii	June 22, 2010	A.C.R.O.N.Y.M. Games	
Singularity	Microsoft Windows	June 29, 2010	Raven Software / Nerve Software	
Singularity	PlayStation 3	June 29, 2010	Raven Software / Nerve Software	
Singularity	Xbox 360	June 29, 2010	Raven Software / Nerve Software	
Spider-Man: Shattered Dimensions	Microsoft Windows	September 7, 2010	Beenox	
Spider-Man: Shattered Dimensions	Nintendo DS	September 7, 2010	Griptonite	
Spider-Man: Shattered Dimensions	PlayStation 3	September 7, 2010	Beenox	
Spider-Man: Shattered Dimensions	Wii	September 7, 2010	Beenox	
Spider-Man: Shattered Dimensions	Xbox 360	September 7, 2010	Beenox	
Cabela's North American Adventures	PlayStation 2	September 14, 2010	Fun Labs	
Cabela's North American Adventures	PlayStation 3	September 14, 2010	Fun Labs	
Cabela's North American Adventures	PlayStation Portable	September 14, 2010	Fun Labs	
Cabela's North American Adventures	Wii	September 14, 2010	Fun Labs	
Cabela's North American Adventures	Xbox 360	September 14, 2010	Fun Labs	
Guitar Hero: Warriors of Rock	PlayStation 3	September 28, 2010	Neversoft	
Guitar Hero: Warriors of Rock	Wii	September 28, 2010	Vicarious Visions	
Guitar Hero: Warriors of Rock	Xbox 360	September 28, 2010	Neversoft	
Rapala: Pro Bass Fishing	PlayStation 2	September 28, 2010	Fun Labs	
Rapala: Pro Bass Fishing	PlayStation 3	September 28, 2010	Fun Labs	
Rapala: Pro Bass Fishing	PlayStation Portable	September 28, 2010	Fun Labs	
Rapala: Pro Bass Fishing	Wii	September 28, 2010	Fun Labs	
Rapala: Pro Bass Fishing	Xbox 360	September 28, 2010	Fun Labs	
DJ Hero 2	PlayStation 3	October 19, 2010	FreeStyleGames	
DJ Hero 2	Wii	October 19, 2010	FreeStyleGames	
DJ Hero 2	Xbox 360	October 19, 2010	FreeStyleGames	
ZhuZhu Pets Featuring the Wild Bunch	Wii	October 21, 2010	Black Lantern Studios	
Bakugan: Defenders of the Core	PlayStation 3	October 26, 2010	Now Production	
Bakugan: Defenders of the Core	PlayStation Portable	October 26, 2010	Now Production	
Bakugan: Defenders of the Core	Wii	October 26, 2010	Now Production	
Bakugan: Defenders of the Core	Xbox 360	October 26, 2010	Now Production	
Cabela's Dangerous Hunts 2011	Nintendo DS	October 26, 2010	Sproing Interactive	
Cabela's Dangerous Hunts 2011	PlayStation 3	October 26, 2010	Cauldron	
Cabela's Dangerous Hunts 2011	Wii	October 26, 2010	Cauldron	
Cabela's Dangerous Hunts 2011	Xbox 360	October 26, 2010	Cauldron	
Tony Hawk: Shred	PlayStation 3	October 26, 2010	Robomodo / Demonware / Buzz Monkey Software	
Tony Hawk: Shred	Wii	October 26, 2010	Buzz Monkey Software	
Tony Hawk: Shred	Xbox 360	October 26, 2010	Robomodo / Demonware / Buzz Monkey Software	
007: Blood Stone	Microsoft Windows	November 2, 2010	High Moon Studios	
007: Blood Stone	Nintendo DS	November 2, 2010	N-Space	
007: Blood Stone	PlayStation 3	November 2, 2010	Bizarre Creations	
007: Blood Stone	Xbox 360	November 2, 2010	Bizarre Creations	
Blood Drive	PlayStation 3	November 2, 2010	Sidhe Interactive	
Blood Drive	Xbox 360	November 2, 2010	Sidhe Interactive	
GoldenEye 007	Nintendo DS	November 2, 2010	N-Space	
GoldenEye 007	Wii	November 2, 2010	Eurocom	
Call of Duty: Black Ops	Microsoft Windows	November 9, 2010	Treyarch / Certain Affinity / Demonware / Nerve Software / Raven Software	
Call of Duty: Black Ops	Nintendo DS	November 9, 2010	N-Space	
Call of Duty: Black Ops	PlayStation 3	November 9, 2010	Treyarch / Certain Affinity / Demonware / Nerve Software / Raven Software	
Call of Duty: Black Ops	Wii	November 9, 2010	Treyarch / Certain Affinity / Demonware / Nerve Software / Raven Software	
Call of Duty: Black Ops	Xbox 360	November 9, 2010	Treyarch / Certain Affinity / Demonware / Nerve Software / Raven Software	
Monster Jam: Path of Destruction	Nintendo DS	November 9, 2010	Virtuos	
Monster Jam: Path of Destruction	PlayStation Portable	November 9, 2010	Virtuos	
Monster Jam: Path of Destruction	Wii	November 9, 2010	Virtuos	
Monster Jam: Path of Destruction	Xbox 360	November 9, 2010	Virtuos	
Apache Air Assault	PlayStation 3	November 16, 2010	Gaijin Entertainment	
Apache Air Assault	Xbox 360	November 16, 2010	Gaijin Entertainment	
iCarly 2: iJoin the Click!	Wii	November 16, 2010	Big Blue Bubble	
iCarly 2: iJoin the Click!	Nintendo DS	November 16, 2010	Big Blue Bubble	
Monster Jam: Path of Destruction	PlayStation 3	November 23, 2010	Virtuos	
Kung Zhu	Nintendo DS	November 23, 2010	1st Playable Productions	
ZhuZhu Pets 2: Featuring the Wild Bunch	Nintendo DS	2010	Black Lantern Studios	
Magical ZhuZhu Princess: Carriages & Castles	Nintendo DS	February 8, 2011	Black Lantern Studios	
Top Shot Arcade	Wii	March 15, 2011	Budcat Creations	
NASCAR The Game 2011	PlayStation 3	March 29, 2011	Eutechnyx	
NASCAR The Game 2011	Xbox 360	March 29, 2011	Eutechnyx	
ZhuZhu Puppies	Nintendo DS	March 29, 2011	Black Lantern Studios	
Squinkies	Nintendo DS	April 12, 2011	Human Soft	
NASCAR The Game 2011	Wii	May 24, 2011	Eutechnyx	
Transformers: Dark of the Moon	PlayStation 3	June 14, 2011	High Moon Studios	
Transformers: Dark of the Moon	Xbox 360	June 14, 2011	High Moon Studios	
Transformers: Dark of the Moon - Autobots	Nintendo DS	June 14, 2011	Behaviour Interactive	
Transformers: Dark of the Moon - Decepticons	Nintendo DS	June 14, 2011	Behaviour Interactive	
Transformers: Dark of the Moon - Stealth Force Edition	Nintendo 3DS	June 14, 2011	Behaviour Interactive	
Transformers: Dark of the Moon - Stealth Force Edition	Wii	June 14, 2011	Behaviour Interactive	
X-Men: Destiny	Nintendo DS	September 27, 2011	Other Ocean Interactive	
X-Men: Destiny	PlayStation 3	September 27, 2011	Silicon Knights	
X-Men: Destiny	Wii	September 27, 2011	Silicon Knights	
X-Men: Destiny	Xbox 360	September 27, 2011	Silicon Knights	
ZhuZhu Pets: Quest for Zhu	Nintendo DS	September 27, 2011	Black Lantern Studios	
Spider-Man: Edge of Time	Nintendo 3DS	October 4, 2011	Beenox	
Spider-Man: Edge of Time	Nintendo DS	October 4, 2011	Other Ocean Interactive	
Spider-Man: Edge of Time	PlayStation 3	October 4, 2011	Beenox	
Spider-Man: Edge of Time	Wii	October 4, 2011	Beenox	
Spider-Man: Edge of Time	Xbox 360	October 4, 2011	Beenox	
Skylanders: Spyro's Adventure	Macintosh	October 16, 2011	XPEC Entertainment / Toys for Bob	
Skylanders: Spyro's Adventure	Microsoft Windows	October 16, 2011	XPEC Entertainment / Toys for Bob	
Skylanders: Spyro's Adventure	Nintendo 3DS	October 16, 2011	Vicarious Visions	
Skylanders: Spyro's Adventure	PlayStation 3	October 16, 2011	XPEC Entertainment / Toys for Bob	
Skylanders: Spyro's Adventure	Wii	October 16, 2011	XPEC Entertainment / Toys for Bob	
Skylanders: Spyro's Adventure	Xbox 360	October 16, 2011	XPEC Entertainment / Toys for Bob	
Generator Rex: Agent of Providence	Nintendo DS	October 25, 2011	Virtuos	
GoldenEye 007: Reloaded	PlayStation 3	November 1, 2011	Eurocom	
GoldenEye 007: Reloaded	Xbox 360	November 1, 2011	Eurocom	
NASCAR: Unleashed	Nintendo 3DS	November 1, 2011	Firebrand Games	
NASCAR: Unleashed	PlayStation 3	November 1, 2011	Firebrand Games	
NASCAR: Unleashed	Wii	November 1, 2011	Firebrand Games	
NASCAR: Unleashed	Xbox 360	November 1, 2011	Firebrand Games	
ZhuZhu Babies	Nintendo DS	November 1, 2011	Black Lantern Studios	
Zoobles!: Spring to Life!	Nintendo DS	November 1, 2011	Now Production	
Call of Duty: Modern Warfare 3	Microsoft Windows	November 8, 2011	Infinity Ward / Sledgehammer Games / Raven Software / Treyarch / Neversoft	
Call of Duty: Modern Warfare 3	PlayStation 3	November 8, 2011	Infinity Ward / Sledgehammer Games / Raven Software / Treyarch / Neversoft	
Call of Duty: Modern Warfare 3	Wii	November 8, 2011	Treyarch	
Call of Duty: Modern Warfare 3	Xbox 360	November 8, 2011	Infinity Ward / Sledgehammer Games / Raven Software / Treyarch / Neversoft	
Call of Duty: Modern Warfare 3 - Defiance	Nintendo DS	November 8, 2011	N-Space	
Lalaloopsy: Sew Magical! Sew Cute!	Nintendo DS	November 8, 2011	1st Playable Productions	
Moshi Monsters: Moshling Zoo	Nintendo DS	November 8, 2011	Black Lantern Studios	
Wappy Dog	Nintendo DS	November 8, 2011	Sonic Powered	
DreamWorks Super Star Kartz	Nintendo DS	November 15, 2011	Virtuos	
Bakugan: Rise of the Resistance	Nintendo DS	November 18, 2011	Magic Pockets	
Big League Sports	Xbox 360	November 2011	Robomodo	
Call of Duty: Black Ops - Zombies	Android	December 1, 2011	Ideaworks Game Studio	
Call of Duty: Black Ops - Zombies	iOS	December 1, 2011	Ideaworks Game Studio	
Prototype 2	PlayStation 3	April 24, 2012	Radical Entertainment / Demonware	
Prototype 2	Xbox 360	April 24, 2012	Radical Entertainment / Demonware	
Battleship	Nintendo 3DS	May 15, 2012	Magic Pockets	
Battleship	Nintendo DS	May 15, 2012	Magic Pockets	
Battleship	PlayStation 3	May 15, 2012	Double Helix Games	
Battleship	Wii	May 15, 2012	Magic Pockets	
Battleship	Xbox 360	May 15, 2012	Double Helix Games	
MIB: Alien Crisis	PlayStation 3	May 22, 2012	Fun Labs / Games Farm	
MIB: Alien Crisis	Wii	May 22, 2012	Fun Labs / Games Farm	
MIB: Alien Crisis	Xbox 360	May 22, 2012	Fun Labs / Games Farm	
The Amazing Spider-Man	Nintendo 3DS	June 26, 2012	Beenox	
The Amazing Spider-Man	Nintendo DS	June 26, 2012	Other Ocean Interactive	
The Amazing Spider-Man	PlayStation 3	June 26, 2012	Beenox	
The Amazing Spider-Man	Wii	June 26, 2012	Beenox	
The Amazing Spider-Man	Xbox 360	June 26, 2012	Beenox	
Ice Age: Continental Drift - Arctic Games	Microsoft Windows	July 10, 2012	Behaviour Interactive	
Ice Age: Continental Drift - Arctic Games	Nintendo 3DS	July 10, 2012	Behaviour Interactive	
Ice Age: Continental Drift - Arctic Games	Nintendo DS	July 10, 2012	Behaviour Interactive	
Ice Age: Continental Drift - Arctic Games	PlayStation 3	July 10, 2012	Behaviour Interactive	
Ice Age: Continental Drift - Arctic Games	Wii	July 10, 2012	Behaviour Interactive	
Ice Age: Continental Drift - Arctic Games	Xbox 360	July 10, 2012	Behaviour Interactive	
Tony Hawk's Pro Skater HD	Xbox Live Arcade	July 18, 2012	Robomodo	
Prototype 2	Microsoft Windows	July 24, 2012	Radical Entertainment / Demonware	
Pitfall!	Android	August 8, 2012	The Blast Furnace / Red Kite Games	
Pitfall!	iOS	August 8, 2012	The Blast Furnace / Red Kite Games	
The Amazing Spider-Man	Microsoft Windows	August 10, 2012	Beenox	
Transformers: Fall of Cybertron	Microsoft Windows	August 21, 2012	High Moon Studios	
Transformers: Fall of Cybertron	PlayStation 3	August 21, 2012	High Moon Studios	
Transformers: Fall of Cybertron	Xbox 360	August 21, 2012	High Moon Studios	
Teenage Mutant Ninja Turtles: Out of the Shadows	Xbox Live Arcade	August 28, 2012	Red Fly Studio	
Tony Hawk's Pro Skater HD	PlayStation 3	August 28, 2012	Robomodo	
Tony Hawk's Pro Skater HD	Microsoft Windows	September 18, 2012	Robomodo	
Wipeout 3	Nintendo 3DS	September 25, 2012	Behaviour Interactive	
Wipeout 3	Wii	September 25, 2012	Behaviour Interactive	
Wipeout 3	Wii U	September 25, 2012	Behaviour Interactive	
Wipeout 3	Xbox 360	September 25, 2012	Behaviour Interactive	
007: Legends	PlayStation 3	October 16, 2012	Eurocom / Demonware	
007: Legends	Xbox 360	October 16, 2012	Eurocom / Demonware	
Skylanders Giants	Nintendo 3DS	October 21, 2012	N-Space	
Skylanders Giants	PlayStation 3	October 21, 2012	Toys for Bob	
Skylanders Giants	Wii	October 21, 2012	Toys for Bob	
Skylanders Giants	Xbox 360	October 21, 2012	Toys for Bob	
Cabela's Dangerous Hunts 2013	Microsoft Windows	October 23, 2012	Cauldron	
Cabela's Dangerous Hunts 2013	PlayStation 3	October 23, 2012	Cauldron	
Cabela's Dangerous Hunts 2013	Wii	October 23, 2012	Cauldron	
Cabela's Dangerous Hunts 2013	Xbox 360	October 23, 2012	Cauldron	
Cabela's Hunting Expeditions	Microsoft Windows	October 23, 2012	Fun Labs	
Cabela's Hunting Expeditions	PlayStation 3	October 23, 2012	Fun Labs	
Cabela's Hunting Expeditions	Wii	October 23, 2012	Fun Labs	
Cabela's Hunting Expeditions	Xbox 360	October 23, 2012	Fun Labs	
Bratz Fashion Boutique	Nintendo 3DS	October 30, 2012	Glam Workshop	
Bratz Fashion Boutique	Nintendo DS	October 30, 2012	Glam Workshop	
Lalaloopsy: Carnival of Friends	Nintendo 3DS	October 30, 2012	WayForward Technologies	
Lalaloopsy: Carnival of Friends	Nintendo DS	October 30, 2012	WayForward Technologies	
Moshi Monsters: Moshlings Theme Park	Nintendo 3DS	October 30, 2012	Black Lantern Studios	
Moshi Monsters: Moshlings Theme Park	Nintendo DS	October 30, 2012	Black Lantern Studios	
The Trash Pack	Nintendo 3DS	October 30, 2012	Webfoot Technologies	
The Trash Pack	Nintendo DS	October 30, 2012	Webfoot Technologies	
Transformers: Prime - The Game	Nintendo DS	October 30, 2012	Altron	
Transformers: Prime - The Game	Wii	October 30, 2012	Now Production	
Wreck-It Ralph	Nintendo 3DS	October 30, 2012	ImaginEngine / Pipeworks Software	
Wreck-It Ralph	Nintendo DS	October 30, 2012	ImaginEngine / Pipeworks Software	
Wreck-It Ralph	Wii	October 30, 2012	ImaginEngine / Pipeworks Software	
007: Legends	Microsoft Windows	November 2, 2012	Eurocom / Demonware	
NASCAR: The Game - Inside Line	PlayStation 3	November 6, 2012	Eutechnyx	
NASCAR: The Game - Inside Line	Wii	November 6, 2012	Eutechnyx	
NASCAR: The Game - Inside Line	Xbox 360	November 6, 2012	Eutechnyx	
Skylanders: Lost Islands	Android	November 8, 2012	Vicarious Visions	
Skylanders: Lost Islands	iOS	November 8, 2012	Vicarious Visions	
Call of Duty: Black Ops II	Microsoft Windows	November 13, 2012	Treyarch / Beachhead Studio / Nerve Software / Neversoft / Radical Entertainment / Sledgehammer Games	
Call of Duty: Black Ops II	PlayStation 3	November 13, 2012	Treyarch / Beachhead Studio / Nerve Software / Neversoft / Radical Entertainment / Sledgehammer Games	
Call of Duty: Black Ops II	Xbox 360	November 13, 2012	Treyarch / Beachhead Studio / Nerve Software / Neversoft / Radical Entertainment / Sledgehammer Games	
Call of Duty: Black Ops - Declassified	PlayStation Vita	November 13, 2012	Nihilistic Software	
Call of Duty: Black Ops II	Wii U	November 18, 2012	Treyarch	
Skylanders Giants	Wii U	November 18, 2012	Vicarious Visions	
Transformers: Prime - The Game	Wii U	November 18, 2012	Now Production	
Family Guy: Back to the Multiverse	Microsoft Windows	November 20, 2012	Heavy Iron Studios	
Family Guy: Back to the Multiverse	PlayStation 3	November 20, 2012	Heavy Iron Studios	
Family Guy: Back to the Multiverse	Xbox 360	November 20, 2012	Heavy Iron Studios	
Skylanders: Battlegrounds	Android	November 20, 2012	Vicarious Visions	
Skylanders: Battlegrounds	iOS	November 20, 2012	Vicarious Visions	
Cabela's Dangerous Hunts 2013	Wii U	December 4, 2012	Cauldron	
Rapala: Pro Bass Fishing	Wii U	December 4, 2012	Fun Labs	
007: Legends	Wii U	December 11, 2012	Eurocom / Demonware	
The Walking Dead: Survival Instinct	Microsoft Windows	March 19, 2013	Terminal Reality	
The Walking Dead: Survival Instinct	PlayStation 3	March 19, 2013	Terminal Reality	
The Walking Dead: Survival Instinct	Wii U	March 19, 2013	Terminal Reality	
The Walking Dead: Survival Instinct	Xbox 360	March 19, 2013	Terminal Reality	
Fast & Furious: Showdown	Nintendo 3DS	May 21, 2013	Firebrand Games	
Fast & Furious: Showdown	Microsoft Windows	May 21, 2013	Firebrand Games	
Fast & Furious: Showdown	PlayStation 3	May 21, 2013	Firebrand Games	
Fast & Furious: Showdown	Wii U	May 21, 2013	Firebrand Games	
Fast & Furious: Showdown	Xbox 360	May 21, 2013	Firebrand Games	
Deadpool	Microsoft Windows	June 25, 2013	High Moon Studios	
Deadpool	PlayStation 3	June 25, 2013	High Moon Studios	
Deadpool	Xbox 360	June 25, 2013	High Moon Studios	
Teenage Mutant Ninja Turtles: Out of the Shadows	Microsoft Windows	August 28, 2013	Red Fly Studio	
Call of Duty: Strike Team	iOS	September 5, 2013	The Blast Furnace / FreeStyleGames	
Skylanders: Swap Force	Nintendo 3DS	October 13, 2013	N-Space	
Skylanders: Swap Force	PlayStation 3	October 13, 2013	Vicarious Visions	
Skylanders: Swap Force	Wii	October 13, 2013	Vicarious Visions	
Skylanders: Swap Force	Wii U	October 13, 2013	Vicarious Visions	
Skylanders: Swap Force	Xbox 360	October 13, 2013	Vicarious Visions	
Cabela's African Adventures	Microsoft Windows	October 15, 2013	Fun Labs	
Cabela's African Adventures	PlayStation 3	October 15, 2013	Fun Labs	
Cabela's African Adventures	Wii	October 15, 2013	Fun Labs	
Cabela's African Adventures	Xbox 360	October 15, 2013	Fun Labs	
SpongeBob SquarePants: Plankton's Robotic Revenge	Nintendo 3DS	October 22, 2013	Behaviour Interactive	
SpongeBob SquarePants: Plankton's Robotic Revenge	PlayStation 3	October 22, 2013	Behaviour Interactive	
SpongeBob SquarePants: Plankton's Robotic Revenge	Wii	October 22, 2013	Behaviour Interactive	
SpongeBob SquarePants: Plankton's Robotic Revenge	Wii U	October 22, 2013	Behaviour Interactive	
SpongeBob SquarePants: Plankton's Robotic Revenge	Xbox 360	October 22, 2013	Behaviour Interactive	
SpongeBob SquarePants: Plankton's Robotic Revenge	Nintendo DS	October 22, 2013	Engine Software	
Teenage Mutant Ninja Turtles	Nintendo 3DS	October 22, 2013	Magic Pockets	
Teenage Mutant Ninja Turtles	Wii	October 22, 2013	Magic Pockets	
Teenage Mutant Ninja Turtles	Xbox 360	October 22, 2013	Magic Pockets	
Call of Duty: Strike Team	Android	October 24, 2013	The Blast Furnace / FreeStyleGames	
Angry Birds: Star Wars	Nintendo 3DS	October 29, 2013	Exient Entertainment	
Angry Birds: Star Wars	PlayStation 3	October 29, 2013	Exient Entertainment	
Angry Birds: Star Wars	PlayStation Vita	October 29, 2013	Exient Entertainment	
Angry Birds: Star Wars	Wii	October 29, 2013	Exient Entertainment	
Angry Birds: Star Wars	Wii U	October 29, 2013	Exient Entertainment	
Angry Birds: Star Wars	Xbox 360	October 29, 2013	Exient Entertainment	
Call of Duty: Ghosts	Microsoft Windows	November 5, 2013	Infinity Ward / Neversoft / Raven Software / Beachhead Studio / Certain Affinity / Demonware / FreeStyleGames / High Moon Studios / Nerve Software / Treyarch	
Call of Duty: Ghosts	PlayStation 3	November 5, 2013	Infinity Ward / Neversoft / Raven Software / Beachhead Studio / Certain Affinity / Demonware / FreeStyleGames / High Moon Studios / Nerve Software / Treyarch	
Call of Duty: Ghosts	Wii U	November 5, 2013	Infinity Ward / Neversoft / Raven Software / Beachhead Studio / Certain Affinity / Demonware / FreeStyleGames / High Moon Studios / Nerve Software / Treyarch	
Call of Duty: Ghosts	Xbox 360	November 5, 2013	Infinity Ward / Neversoft / Raven Software / Beachhead Studio / Certain Affinity / Demonware / FreeStyleGames / High Moon Studios / Nerve Software / Treyarch	
Angry Birds: Star Wars	PlayStation 4	November 15, 2013	Exient Entertainment	
Call of Duty: Ghosts	PlayStation 4	November 15, 2013	Infinity Ward / Neversoft / Raven Software / Beachhead Studio / Certain Affinity / Demonware / FreeStyleGames / High Moon Studios / Nerve Software / Treyarch	
Skylanders: Swap Force	PlayStation 4	November 15, 2013	Vicarious Visions	
Angry Birds: Star Wars	Xbox One	November 22, 2013	Exient Entertainment	
Call of Duty: Ghosts	Xbox One	November 22, 2013	Infinity Ward / Neversoft / Raven Software / Beachhead Studio / Certain Affinity / Demonware / FreeStyleGames / High Moon Studios / Nerve Software / Treyarch	
Skylanders: Swap Force	Xbox One	November 22, 2013	Vicarious Visions	
The Amazing Spider-Man	PlayStation Vita	November 22, 2013	Beenox	
Cabela's Big Game Hunter: Pro Hunts	Microsoft Windows	March 25, 2014	Cauldron	
Cabela's Big Game Hunter: Pro Hunts	PlayStation 3	March 25, 2014	Cauldron	
Cabela's Big Game Hunter: Pro Hunts	Wii U	March 25, 2014	Cauldron	
Cabela's Big Game Hunter: Pro Hunts	Xbox 360	March 25, 2014	Cauldron	
Teenage Mutant Ninja Turtles: Out of the Shadows	PlayStation 3	April 15, 2014	Red Fly Studio	
The Amazing Spider-Man 2	Microsoft Windows	April 29, 2014	Beenox	
The Amazing Spider-Man 2	PlayStation 3	April 29, 2014	Beenox	
The Amazing Spider-Man 2	PlayStation 4	April 29, 2014	Beenox	
The Amazing Spider-Man 2	Wii U	April 29, 2014	Beenox	
The Amazing Spider-Man 2	Xbox 360	April 29, 2014	Beenox	
The Amazing Spider-Man 2	Xbox One	April 29, 2014	Beenox	
Transformers: Rise of the Dark Spark	Microsoft Windows	June 24, 2014	Edge of Reality	
Transformers: Rise of the Dark Spark	Nintendo 3DS	June 24, 2014	WayForward Technologies	
Transformers: Rise of the Dark Spark	PlayStation 3	June 24, 2014	Edge of Reality	
Transformers: Rise of the Dark Spark	PlayStation 4	June 24, 2014	Edge of Reality	
Transformers: Rise of the Dark Spark	Wii U	June 24, 2014	Edge of Reality	
Transformers: Rise of the Dark Spark	Xbox 360	June 24, 2014	Edge of Reality	
Transformers: Rise of the Dark Spark	Xbox One	June 24, 2014	Edge of Reality	
Teenage Mutant Ninja Turtles	Nintendo 3DS	August 5, 2014	Magic Pockets	
Destiny	PlayStation 3	September 9, 2014	Bungie / Radical Entertainment	
Destiny	PlayStation 4	September 9, 2014	Bungie / Radical Entertainment	
Destiny	Xbox 360	September 9, 2014	Bungie / Radical Entertainment	
Destiny	Xbox One	September 9, 2014	Bungie / Radical Entertainment	
Skylanders: Trap Team	Android	October 5, 2014	Vicarious Visions / Beenox	
Skylanders: Trap Team	iOS	October 5, 2014	Vicarious Visions / Beenox	
Skylanders: Trap Team	Nintendo 3DS	October 5, 2014	Beenox	
Skylanders: Trap Team	PlayStation 3	October 5, 2014	Vicarious Visions / Beenox	
Skylanders: Trap Team	PlayStation 4	October 5, 2014	Vicarious Visions / Beenox	
Skylanders: Trap Team	Wii	October 5, 2014	Vicarious Visions / Beenox	
Skylanders: Trap Team	Wii U	October 5, 2014	Vicarious Visions / Beenox	
Skylanders: Trap Team	Xbox 360	October 5, 2014	Vicarious Visions / Beenox	
Skylanders: Trap Team	Xbox One	October 5, 2014	Vicarious Visions / Beenox	
Duck Dynasty	Microsoft Windows	October 14, 2014	Fun Labs	
Duck Dynasty	Nintendo 3DS	October 14, 2014	Black Lantern Studios	
Duck Dynasty	PlayStation 3	October 14, 2014	Fun Labs	
Duck Dynasty	PlayStation 4	October 14, 2014	Fun Labs	
Duck Dynasty	Xbox 360	October 14, 2014	Fun Labs	
Duck Dynasty	Xbox One	October 14, 2014	Fun Labs	
The Legend of Korra	Microsoft Windows	October 21, 2014	PlatinumGames	
The Legend of Korra	PlayStation 3	October 21, 2014	PlatinumGames	
The Legend of Korra	PlayStation 4	October 21, 2014	PlatinumGames	
The Legend of Korra	Xbox 360	October 21, 2014	PlatinumGames	
The Legend of Korra	Xbox One	October 21, 2014	PlatinumGames	
The Voice: I Want You	PlayStation 3	October 21, 2014	BitComposer Interactive	
The Voice: I Want You	Wii	October 21, 2014	BitComposer Interactive	
The Voice: I Want You	Wii U	October 21, 2014	BitComposer Interactive	
The Voice: I Want You	Xbox 360	October 21, 2014	BitComposer Interactive	
The Legend of Korra: A New Era Begins	Nintendo 3DS	October 28, 2014	Webfoot Technologies	
Teenage Mutant Ninja Turtles: Danger of the Ooze	PlayStation 3	October 28, 2014	WayForward Technologies	
Teenage Mutant Ninja Turtles: Danger of the Ooze	Xbox 360	October 28, 2014	WayForward Technologies	
Call of Duty: Advanced Warfare	Microsoft Windows	November 4, 2014	Sledgehammer Games / High Moon Studios / Raven Software	
Call of Duty: Advanced Warfare	PlayStation 3	November 4, 2014	Sledgehammer Games / High Moon Studios / Raven Software	
Call of Duty: Advanced Warfare	PlayStation 4	November 4, 2014	Sledgehammer Games / High Moon Studios / Raven Software	
Call of Duty: Advanced Warfare	Xbox 360	November 4, 2014	Sledgehammer Games / High Moon Studios / Raven Software	
Call of Duty: Advanced Warfare	Xbox One	November 4, 2014	Sledgehammer Games / High Moon Studios / Raven Software	
Teenage Mutant Ninja Turtles: Danger of the Ooze	Nintendo 3DS	November 11, 2014	WayForward Technologies	
Call of Duty: Heroes	Android	November 26, 2014	Faceroll Games	
Call of Duty: Heroes	iOS	November 26, 2014	Faceroll Games	
SpongeBob HeroPants	Nintendo 3DS	February 3, 2015	Behaviour Santiago	
SpongeBob HeroPants	PlayStation Vita	February 3, 2015	Behaviour Santiago	
SpongeBob HeroPants	Xbox 360	February 3, 2015	Behaviour Santiago	
Chivalry: Medieval Warfare	PlayStation 3	February 10, 2015	Mercenary Technology	
Chivalry: Medieval Warfare	Xbox 360	February 10, 2015	Mercenary Technology	
White Night	Linux	March 3, 2015	OSome Studio	
White Night	Macintosh	March 3, 2015	OSome Studio	
White Night	Microsoft Windows	March 3, 2015	OSome Studio	
White Night	PlayStation 4	March 3, 2015	OSome Studio	
White Night	Xbox One	March 3, 2015	OSome Studio	
Cabela's African Adventures	PlayStation 4	March 17, 2015	Fun Labs	
Cabela's African Adventures	Xbox One	March 17, 2015	Fun Labs	
Prototype: Biohazard Bundle	PlayStation 4	August 11, 2015	Radical Entertainment	
Prototype: Biohazard Bundle	Xbox One	August 11, 2015	Radical Entertainment	
Downton Abbey: Mysteries of the Manor	Android	September 9, 2015	Tag Games	
Downton Abbey: Mysteries of the Manor	iOS	September 9, 2015	Tag Games	
Skylanders: Battlecast	Android	September 20, 2015	Beachhead Studio / FreeStyleGames / Seismic Games / Radical Entertainment	
Skylanders: Battlecast	iOS	September 20, 2015	Beachhead Studio / FreeStyleGames / Seismic Games / Radical Entertainment	
Skylanders: SuperChargers	iOS	September 20, 2015	Vicarious Visions	
Skylanders: SuperChargers	PlayStation 3	September 20, 2015	Vicarious Visions	
Skylanders: SuperChargers	PlayStation 4	September 20, 2015	Vicarious Visions	
Skylanders: SuperChargers	Wii U	September 20, 2015	Vicarious Visions	
Skylanders: SuperChargers	Xbox 360	September 20, 2015	Vicarious Visions	
Skylanders: SuperChargers	Xbox One	September 20, 2015	Vicarious Visions	
Skylanders: SuperChargers Racing	Nintendo 3DS	September 20, 2015	Vicarious Visions / Beenox	
Skylanders: SuperChargers Racing	Wii	September 20, 2015	Vicarious Visions / Beenox	
Tony Hawk's Pro Skater 5	PlayStation 4	December 15, 2015	Robomodo / Disruptive Games	
Tony Hawk's Pro Skater 5	Xbox One	December 15, 2015	Robomodo / Disruptive Games	
Transformers: Devastation	Microsoft Windows	October 6, 2015	PlatinumGames	
Transformers: Devastation	PlayStation 3	October 6, 2015	PlatinumGames	
Transformers: Devastation	PlayStation 4	October 6, 2015	PlatinumGames	
Transformers: Devastation	Xbox 360	October 6, 2015	PlatinumGames	
Transformers: Devastation	Xbox One	October 6, 2015	PlatinumGames	
Guitar Hero Live	iOS	October 20, 2015	FreeStyleGames / Zoë Mode	
Guitar Hero Live	PlayStation 3	October 20, 2015	FreeStyleGames / Zoë Mode	
Guitar Hero Live	PlayStation 4	October 20, 2015	FreeStyleGames / Zoë Mode	
Guitar Hero Live	Wii U	October 20, 2015	FreeStyleGames / Zoë Mode	
Guitar Hero Live	Xbox 360	October 20, 2015	FreeStyleGames / Zoë Mode	
Guitar Hero Live	Xbox One	October 20, 2015	FreeStyleGames / Zoë Mode	
The Peanuts Movie: Snoopy's Grand Adventure	Nintendo 3DS	November 5, 2015	Behaviour Santiago	
The Peanuts Movie: Snoopy's Grand Adventure	PlayStation 4	November 5, 2015	Behaviour Santiago	
The Peanuts Movie: Snoopy's Grand Adventure	Wii U	November 5, 2015	Behaviour Santiago	
The Peanuts Movie: Snoopy's Grand Adventure	Xbox 360	November 5, 2015	Behaviour Santiago	
The Peanuts Movie: Snoopy's Grand Adventure	Xbox One	November 5, 2015	Behaviour Santiago	
Call of Duty: Black Ops III	Microsoft Windows	November 6, 2015	Treyarch / Nerve Software / Raven Software	
Call of Duty: Black Ops III	PlayStation 3	November 6, 2015	Treyarch / Nerve Software / Raven Software	
Call of Duty: Black Ops III	PlayStation 4	November 6, 2015	Treyarch / Nerve Software / Raven Software	
Call of Duty: Black Ops III	Xbox 360	November 6, 2015	Treyarch / Nerve Software / Raven Software	
Call of Duty: Black Ops III	Xbox One	November 6, 2015	Treyarch / Nerve Software / Raven Software	
Deadpool	PlayStation 4	November 17, 2015	High Moon Studios	
Deadpool	Xbox One	November 17, 2015	High Moon Studios	
Chivalry: Medieval Warfare	PlayStation 4	December 1, 2015	Hardsuit Labs	
Chivalry: Medieval Warfare	Xbox One	December 1, 2015	Hardsuit Labs	
Tony Hawk's Pro Skater 5	PlayStation 3	September 29, 2015	Fun Labs	
Tony Hawk's Pro Skater 5	Xbox 360	September 29, 2015	Fun Labs	
Teenage Mutant Ninja Turtles: Mutants in Manhattan	Microsoft Windows	May 24, 2016	PlatinumGames	
Teenage Mutant Ninja Turtles: Mutants in Manhattan	PlayStation 3	May 24, 2016	PlatinumGames	
Teenage Mutant Ninja Turtles: Mutants in Manhattan	PlayStation 4	May 24, 2016	PlatinumGames	
Teenage Mutant Ninja Turtles: Mutants in Manhattan	Xbox 360	May 24, 2016	PlatinumGames	
Teenage Mutant Ninja Turtles: Mutants in Manhattan	Xbox One	May 24, 2016	PlatinumGames	
Ghostbusters: Slime City	Android	July 8, 2016	EightPixelsSquare	
Ghostbusters: Slime City	iOS	July 8, 2016	EightPixelsSquare	
Ghostbusters	Microsoft Windows	July 12, 2016	FireForge	
Ghostbusters	PlayStation 4	July 12, 2016	FireForge	
Ghostbusters	Xbox One	July 12, 2016	FireForge	
Marvel Ultimate Alliance	PlayStation 4	July 26, 2016	Raven Software	
Marvel Ultimate Alliance	Xbox One	July 26, 2016	Raven Software	
Marvel Ultimate Alliance 2	PlayStation 4	July 26, 2016	Vicarious Visions	
Marvel Ultimate Alliance 2	Xbox One	July 26, 2016	Vicarious Visions	
Skylanders: Imaginators	PlayStation 3	October 16, 2016	Toys for Bob / Vicarious Visions	
Skylanders: Imaginators	PlayStation 4	October 16, 2016	Toys for Bob / Vicarious Visions	
Skylanders: Imaginators	Wii U	October 16, 2016	Toys for Bob / Vicarious Visions	
Skylanders: Imaginators	Xbox 360	October 16, 2016	Toys for Bob / Vicarious Visions	
Skylanders: Imaginators	Xbox One	October 16, 2016	Toys for Bob / Vicarious Visions	
Call of Duty: Infinite Warfare	Microsoft Windows	November 4, 2016	Infinity Ward / Beenox / Demonware / FreeStyleGames / Heavy Iron Studios / High Moon Studios / Raven Software / Treyarch / Vicarious Visions	
Call of Duty: Infinite Warfare	PlayStation 4	November 4, 2016	Infinity Ward / Beenox / Demonware / FreeStyleGames / Heavy Iron Studios / High Moon Studios / Raven Software / Treyarch / Vicarious Visions	
Call of Duty: Infinite Warfare	Xbox One	November 4, 2016	Infinity Ward / Beenox / Demonware / FreeStyleGames / Heavy Iron Studios / High Moon Studios / Raven Software / Treyarch / Vicarious Visions	
Call of Duty: Infinite Warfare - Jackal Assault VR Experience	PlayStation VR	November 4, 2016	Paper Crane Games	
Call of Duty: Modern Warfare - Remastered	Microsoft Windows	November 4, 2016	Raven Software	
Call of Duty: Modern Warfare - Remastered	PlayStation 4	November 4, 2016	Raven Software	
Call of Duty: Modern Warfare - Remastered	Xbox One	November 4, 2016	Raven Software	
Skylanders: Imaginators	Nintendo Switch	March 3, 2017	Toys for Bob / Vicarious Visions	
Crash Bandicoot: N. Sane Trilogy	PlayStation 4	June 30, 2017	Vicarious Visions / Toys for Bob	
Crash Bandicoot: N. Sane Trilogy	Xbox One	June 30, 2017	Vicarious Visions / Toys for Bob	
Destiny 2	PlayStation 4	September 6, 2017	Bungie / High Moon Studios / Raven Software	
Destiny 2	Xbox One	September 6, 2017	Bungie / High Moon Studios / Raven Software	
Destiny 2	Microsoft Windows	October 24, 2017	Bungie / High Moon Studios / Raven Software	
Call of Duty: WWII	Microsoft Windows	November 3, 2017	Sledgehammer Games / Raven Software	
Call of Duty: WWII	PlayStation 4	November 3, 2017	Sledgehammer Games / Raven Software	
Call of Duty: WWII	Xbox One	November 3, 2017	Sledgehammer Games / Raven Software	
Crash Bandicoot: N. Sane Trilogy	Microsoft Windows	June 29, 2018	Vicarious Visions / Toys for Bob	
Crash Bandicoot: N. Sane Trilogy	Nintendo Switch	June 29, 2018	Vicarious Visions / Toys for Bob	
Call of Duty: Black Ops 4	Microsoft Windows	October 12, 2018	Treyarch / Beenox / Demonware / High Moon Studios / Raven Software / Sledgehammer Games	
Call of Duty: Black Ops 4	PlayStation 4	October 12, 2018	Treyarch / Beenox / Demonware / High Moon Studios / Raven Software / Sledgehammer Games	
Call of Duty: Black Ops 4	Xbox One	October 12, 2018	Treyarch / Beenox / Demonware / High Moon Studios / Raven Software / Sledgehammer Games	
Spyro: Reignited Trilogy	PlayStation 4	November 13, 2018	Toys for Bob	
Spyro: Reignited Trilogy	Xbox One	November 13, 2018	Toys for Bob	
Sekiro: Shadows Die Twice	Microsoft Windows	March 22, 2019	FromSoftware	
Sekiro: Shadows Die Twice	PlayStation 4	March 22, 2019	FromSoftware	
Sekiro: Shadows Die Twice	Xbox One	March 22, 2019	FromSoftware	
Crash Team Racing - Nitro-Fueled	Nintendo Switch	June 20, 2019	Beenox / Vicarious Visions	
Crash Team Racing - Nitro-Fueled	PlayStation 4	June 20, 2019	Beenox / Vicarious Visions	
Crash Team Racing - Nitro-Fueled	Xbox One	June 20, 2019	Beenox / Vicarious Visions	
Spyro: Reignited Trilogy	Microsoft Windows	September 3, 2019	Iron Galaxy Studios	
Spyro: Reignited Trilogy	Nintendo Switch	September 3, 2019	Toys for Bob	
Call of Duty: Mobile	Android	October 1, 2019	TiMi Studios	
Call of Duty: Mobile	iOS	October 1, 2019	TiMi Studios	
Call of Duty: Modern Warfare	Microsoft Windows	October 25, 2019	Infinity Ward / Beenox / High Moon Studios / Raven Software	
Call of Duty: Modern Warfare	PlayStation 4	October 25, 2019	Infinity Ward / Beenox / High Moon Studios / Raven Software	
Call of Duty: Modern Warfare	Xbox One	October 25, 2019	Infinity Ward / Beenox / High Moon Studios / Raven Software	
