= Call of Duty: Modern Warfare: Mobilized =

2009 video game

- Developer: n-Space
- Publisher: Activision
- Series: Call of Duty
- Platform: Nintendo DS
- Release: WW: November 10, 2009
- Genre: First-person shooter
- Modes: Single-player, multiplayer

Call of Duty: Modern Warfare: Mobilized is a 2009 first-person shooter game in the Call of Duty franchise, developed specifically for the Nintendo DS. The game takes place in the same setting as Call of Duty: Modern Warfare 2 and features many elements of gameplay typical to the series, including the usage of iron sights, and vehicular missions. It was released by Activision alongside the console versions of the game on November 10, 2009.

== Gameplay ==
Screenshot

Call of Duty: Modern Warfare: Mobilized features the same first-person shooter gameplay found in its predecessors, Call of Duty 4: Modern Warfare and Call of Duty: World at War. Mobilized includes new weapons and vehicles, new mini-games such as hacking computer terminals, and taking control of UAV spy drones and an AC-130 gunship.

Mobilized also features a six-person online multiplayer mode including new game modes like Sabotage, where players fight to bring a bomb to opposing bases. Single player also features a survival mode in which players must fend off waves of enemies at once, and an arcade mode, where players must complete the single-player campaign in a set time limit for points and unlockable achievements.

Mobilized has a new interface, improved controls and mobility. The AI was also improved, enemies take cover, they can charge with shotguns, pull back when the player enters the room, throw grenades, etc.

== Plot ==
Mobilized does not follow the same storyline as Call of Duty: Modern Warfare 2. Like the previous Nintendo DS Call of Duty games, the storyline serves as a "companion narrative" to the console and PC versions.

The game is set in an alternate reality, five years after Call of Duty 4: Modern Warfare. Ruler Prince Farhad has left the country due to the Ultranationalists. In the middle of this, he decides to purchase a nuclear device to use against them. The Gopher Squad of the SAS and the Warthog Squad of the U.S. Marine Corps quickly work together to prevent the construction and activation of the nuclear device. The nuke is discovered to be supplied by Colonel Ayala, who Sgt. O' Neil and Gopher Squad are ordered to capture. They enter his compound, only to discover that he was killed. Info is extracted from his computer which leads the SAS to a weapons factory in the north. The factory is then infiltrated and explosive charges are planted on the factory's supports. Gopher Squad escapes the factory, only to discover the nuke has been transported away.

The squad then advances to a cliff overlooking the route of the nuke's transport vehicle, and destroys the tanks protecting it with a FGM-148 Javelin. The team leaves the area by boat, leaving the nuke to be recovered by a clean-up crew, though it was picked up by Ayala's Insurgents. Then Zach Parker and Warthog Squad are alerted that the nuke has been sighted north of their location. A UAV Recon Drone is sent to survey all possible areas where the nuke could be hidden. The possible locations are lowered to three different areas, which are investigated using a HAZ Mat robot. The nuke is thought to be at the final location, but it is only large amounts of radiation left behind. Warthog Squad leaves the area in a Humvee found in the third location, heading towards a shipyard, rumored to be the location of the nuke. The team raids the shipyard, checking multiple warehouses, only to find that the nuke is going to be transported away. Warthog Squad fails to recover the nuke, leaving its destination unknown. The SAS receive info that there is an informant named Al-Baq, who knows where the nuke is. The USMC send a squad of tanks to escort Gopher Squad to Al-Baq's location.

When the tanks are heavily damaged, Gopher Squad leaves on foot, to Al-Baq's location. They fight their way to an enemy supply area, where they rest there, and continue to his location. When Al-Baq is secured, he reveals the location of the nuke, an oil rig off the coast of an unnamed city. The USMC send in a helicopter to transport Warthog Squad to the city, where they will fight their way to the shore to acquire a boat, as approach by air is too dangerous. Warthog arrives at the oil rig, where they fight their way to the top, only to see a helicopter departing with the nuke. The helicopter is then tracked to a Russian power plant, where an AC-130 gunship protects the advancing Gopher Squad from above. Gopher Squad fights their way to the inside of the power plant, only to find that the nuke is armed. However, Sgt. O'Neil manages to deactivate the nuke, protecting all of Russia. Prince Farhad escapes the power plant, prompting a questionable invasion of Farhad's country.

== Reception ==
Reception

Aggregate score
| Aggregator | Score |
|---|---|
| Metacritic | 73/100 |

Review scores
| Publication | Score |
|---|---|
| 1Up.com | B |
| Game Informer | 6.5/10 |
| GamesRadar+ | 6.0/10 |
| GameZone | 8.5/10 |
| IGN | 8.0/10 |
| Official Nintendo Magazine | 8.0/10 |

The game has received generally positive reviews, receiving an aggregated score of 73/100 from Metacritic. Gamer.nl awarded the game with a 7/10, stating that "Mobilized is a fairly enjoyable go at the genre on the handheld that impresses technically."
