= Lightmatter =

2020 video game

- Steam header art
- Developer: Tunnel Vision Games
- Publisher: Aspyr
- Engine: Unity
- Platform: Microsoft Windows
- Release: 15 January 2020
- Genre: Puzzle

Lightmatter is a 2020 puzzle video game developed by Tunnel Vision Games and published by Aspyr for Microsoft Windows.

== Gameplay ==
Players must navigate the environment and use items like a spotlight to avoid areas with shadow.

The game is a puzzle video game played in first-person perspective. Players are guided by a scientist, Virgil, through a mountain range and laboratory whilst avoiding shadows made dangerous from an experiment gone awry. They must use light-emitting objects to avoid shadows cast by objects in the environment. A portable spotlight can emit light, but cannot be taken into an area with shadow. A photon connector can help generate a consistent beam of light, but must connect a line between two nodes with a line of sight.

== Development and release ==
Lightmatter was developed by Danish independent developer Tunnel Vision Games, led by a six-person development studio for over three years. The concept for the game originated as an idea shared between five members, who were friends at Aalborg University, who decided to develop the game after graduation. Programmer Benjamin Overgaard stated the visual design for the game's lighting system, created in the Unity engine, was inspired by the photography of Serge Najjar and the games Manifold Garden and White Night. Tunnel Vision co-founder Philip Nymann stated that the game was commercially successful, but the company ended operations after release as the studio was unwilling to "develop new ways of making money from players" to sustain the business. In 2025, the studio released Lightmatter Anniversary, featuring prototype versions and commentary from the developers about the making of the game.

== Reception ==
Reception

Aggregate score
Aggregator	Score
Metacritic	73%

Review scores
Publication	Score
Edge	7/10
Hardcore Gamer	4/5
Slant Magazine	3/5
TechRaptor	8/10
Screen Rant	7/10

According to review aggregator website Metacritic, Lightmatter received "mixed or average" reviews.
