= Call of Duty =

Video game franchise

- Logo used since 2023
- Genre: First-person shooter
- Developers: Infinity Ward (2003–present); Treyarch (2005–present); Sledgehammer Games (2011–present); Raven Software (2015–present); Other: Nerve Software; Gray Matter Studios; Nokia; Exakt Entertainment; Spark Unlimited; Amaze Entertainment; n-Space; Aspyr; Rebellion Developments; Ideaworks Game Studio; nStigate Games; Neversoft; Certain Affinity; High Moon Studios; Beenox; Demonware; Mercenary Technology; Kuju Entertainment; TiMi Studios; Toys for Bob; Digital Legends; Activision Central Design; Activision Central Technology; Activision Shanghai Studio
- Publisher: Activision
- Platforms: View: Android; BlackBerry; GameCube; iOS; J2ME; Nintendo Switch 2; Nintendo DS; Nokia N-Gage; OS X; PlayStation 2; PlayStation 3; PlayStation 4; PlayStation 5; PlayStation Portable; PlayStation Vita; Wii; Wii U; Windows; Xbox; Xbox 360; Xbox One; Xbox Series X/S
- First release: Call of Duty; October 29, 2003
- Latest release: Call of Duty: Modern Warfare 4 October 23, 2026
- Website: callofduty.com

A variation of the original Call of Duty logo font used by the franchise until 2023

Call of Duty (CoD) is a first-person shooter video game series and media franchise published by Activision, starting in 2003. The games were first developed by Infinity Ward, then by Treyarch, Sledgehammer Games and Raven Software. Several spin-off and handheld games were made by other developers. The latest game, Call of Duty: Modern Warfare 4, was released on October 23, 2026.

The series originally focused on a World War II setting, with Infinity Ward developing Call of Duty (2003) and Call of Duty 2 (2005) and Treyarch developing Call of Duty 3 (2006). Infinity Ward's Call of Duty 4: Modern Warfare (2007) introduced a modern setting and proved to be the breakthrough title for the series, creating the Modern Warfare sub-series; a Modern Warfare remastered version was released in 2016. Two other entries, Modern Warfare 2 (2009) and Modern Warfare 3 (2011), were made. The sub-series received a reboot with Modern Warfare in 2019, Modern Warfare II in 2022, and Modern Warfare III in 2023. Infinity Ward has developed two games outside of the Modern Warfare sub-series, Ghosts (2013) and Infinite Warfare (2016).

Treyarch made one last World War II-based game, World at War (2008), before releasing Black Ops (2010) and subsequently creating the Black Ops sub-series. Six more entries, Black Ops II (2012), Black Ops III (2015), Black Ops 4 (2018), Black Ops Cold War (2020), Black Ops 6 (2024), and Black Ops 7 (2025) were made, the latter three in conjunction with Raven Software. Sledgehammer Games, which were co-developers for Modern Warfare 3, have developed three titles, Advanced Warfare (2014), WWII (2017), and Vanguard (2021). They are the lead developer for Modern Warfare III (2023), the third entry in the Modern Warfare reboot sub-series.

As of October 2023, Call of Duty has sold over 500 million copies and has 100 million monthly active players across all platforms. The franchise generated $30 billion in revenue by 2022. The series is verified by the Guinness World Records as the best-selling first-person shooter game series. It is the most successful video game franchise created in the United States and the fourth best-selling video game franchise of all time. Other products in the franchise include a line of action figures designed by Plan B Toys, a card game created by Upper Deck Company, Mega Bloks sets by Mega Brands, and a comic book miniseries published by WildStorm Productions, and a feature film in development by Paramount Pictures, set to be released in 2028.

== Main series ==
Release timeline
2003	Call of Duty
2004	Call of Duty (Mobile)
2004	Call of Duty (N-Gage)
2004	Call of Duty: Finest Hour
2005	Call of Duty 2
2005	Call of Duty 2: Big Red One
2005	Call Of Duty 2 (Mobile)
2006	Call of Duty 3
2007	Call of Duty 3 (Mobile)
2007	Call of Duty 2 Pocket PC Edition
2007	Call of Duty: Roads to Victory
2007	Call of Duty 4: Modern Warfare
2007	Call of Duty 4: Modern Warfare (DS)
2007	Call of Duty 4: Modern Warfare (mobile)
2008	Call of Duty: World at War
2008	Call of Duty: World at War – Final Fronts
2008	Call of Duty: World at War (DS)
2008	Call of Duty: World at War (Mobile)
2009	Call of Duty Zombies
2009	Call of Duty: Modern Warfare 2
2009	Call Of Duty: Modern Warfare 2: Force Recon
2009	Call of Duty: Modern Warfare: Mobilized
2009	Call of Duty: Modern Warfare Reflex
2009	Call of Duty Classic
2010	Call of Duty: Black Ops
2010	Call of Duty: Black Ops (DS)
2010	Call of Duty: Black Ops Mobile
2010	Call of Duty: Black Ops Zombies
2011	Call of Duty: Modern Warfare 3
2011	Call of Duty: Modern Warfare 3 – Defiance
2012	Call of Duty: Black Ops II
2012	Call of Duty: Black Ops: Declassified
2012	Call of Duty Online
2013	Call of Duty: Strike Team
2013	Call of Duty: Ghosts
2014	Call of Duty: Advanced Warfare
2014	Call of Duty: Heroes
2015	Call of Duty: Black Ops III
2016	Call of Duty: Infinite Warfare
2016	Call of Duty: Modern Warfare Remastered
2017	Call of Duty: WWII
2018	Call of Duty: Black Ops 4
2019	Call of Duty: Mobile
2019	Call of Duty: Modern Warfare
2020	Call of Duty: Warzone
2020	Call of Duty: Modern Warfare 2 Campaign Remastered
2020	Call of Duty: Black Ops Cold War
2021	Call of Duty: Vanguard
2022	Call of Duty: Modern Warfare II
2022	Call of Duty: Warzone 2.0
2023	Call of Duty: Modern Warfare III
2024	Call of Duty: Warzone Mobile
2024	Call of Duty: Black Ops 6
2025	Call of Duty: Black Ops 7
2026	Call of Duty: Modern Warfare 4

Titles in the Call of Duty series
Title	Year	Platform	Lead developer
Call of Duty	2003	Windows, macOS, PS3, (Note: An enhanced port of the game, titled Call of Duty: Classic, developed by Aspyr, was released in November 2009.) X360	Infinity Ward
Call of Duty 2	2005	Windows, macOS, X360	Infinity Ward
Call of Duty 3	2006	PS2, PS3, Wii, Xbox, X360	Treyarch
Call of Duty 4: Modern Warfare	2007	Windows, (Note: A remastered version of the game, Call of Duty: Modern Warfare Remastered, developed by Raven Software, was released as part of special edition bundles of Call of Duty: Infinite Warfare in November 2016 and as a standalone game in June 2017.) macOS, PS3, PS4, Wii, (Note: A port for the Wii, titled Call of Duty: Modern Warfare – Reflex Edition, developed by Treyarch, was released in November 2009.) X360, XONE	Infinity Ward
Call of Duty: World at War	2008	Windows, PS3, Wii, X360	Treyarch
Call of Duty: Modern Warfare 2	2009	Windows, (Note: A remaster of the game's campaign, Call of Duty: Modern Warfare 2 Campaign Remastered, developed by Beenox, was released in March 2020 for the PS4 and April 2020 for Windows and Xbox One.) macOS, PS3, PS4, X360, XONE	Infinity Ward
Call of Duty: Black Ops	2010	Windows, macOS, PS3, PS4, PS5, Wii, X360	Treyarch
Call of Duty: Modern Warfare 3	2011	Windows, macOS, PS3, Wii, X360	Infinity Ward, Sledgehammer Games
Call of Duty: Black Ops II	2012	Windows, PS3, PS4, PS5, Wii U, X360	Treyarch
Call of Duty: Ghosts	2013	Windows, PS3, PS4, Wii U, X360, XONE	Infinity Ward
Call of Duty: Advanced Warfare	2014	Windows, PS3, PS4, X360, XONE	Sledgehammer Games
Call of Duty: Black Ops III	2015	Windows, macOS, PS3, PS4, X360, XONE	Treyarch
Call of Duty: Infinite Warfare	2016	Windows, PS4, XONE	Infinity Ward
Call of Duty: WWII	2017	Windows, PS4, XONE	Sledgehammer Games
Call of Duty: Black Ops 4	2018	Windows, PS4, XONE	Treyarch
Call of Duty: Modern Warfare	2019	Windows, PS4, XONE	Infinity Ward
Call of Duty: Black Ops Cold War	2020	Windows, PS4, PS5, XONE, X|S	Treyarch, Raven Software
Call of Duty: Vanguard	2021	Windows, PS4, PS5, XONE, X|S	Sledgehammer Games
Call of Duty: Modern Warfare II	2022	Windows, PS4, PS5, XONE, X|S	Infinity Ward
Call of Duty: Modern Warfare III	2023	Windows, PS4, PS5, XONE, X|S	Sledgehammer Games
Call of Duty: Black Ops 6	2024	Windows, PS4, PS5, XONE, X|S	Treyarch, Raven Software
Call of Duty: Black Ops 7	2025	Windows, PS4, PS5, XONE, X|S	Treyarch, Raven Software
Call of Duty: Modern Warfare 4	2026	Windows, PS5, X|S, NS2	Infinity Ward

=== World War II games ===
==== Call of Duty ====
Call of Duty is a first-person shooter video game based on id Tech 3, and was released on October 29, 2003. The game was developed by Infinity Ward and published by Activision. The game simulates the infantry and combined arms warfare of World War II. An expansion pack, Call of Duty: United Offensive, was developed by Gray Matter Studios with contributions from Pi Studios and produced by Activision. The game follows American and British paratroopers and the Red Army. The Mac OS X version of the game was ported by Aspyr Media. In late 2004, the N-Gage version was developed by Nokia and published by Activision. Other versions were released for PC, including Collector's Edition (with soundtrack and strategy guide), Game of the Year Edition (includes game updates), and the Deluxe Edition (which contains the United Offensive expansion and soundtrack; in Europe the soundtrack was not included). On September 22, 2006, Call of Duty, United Offensive, and Call of Duty 2 were released together as Call of Duty: War Chest for PC. Since November 12, 2007, Call of Duty games have been available for purchase via Valve's content delivery platform Steam.

==== Call of Duty 2 ====
Call of Duty 2 is a first-person shooter video game and the sequel to Call of Duty. It was developed by Infinity Ward and published by Activision. The game is set during World War II and is experienced through the perspectives of soldiers in the Red Army, British Army, and United States Army. It was released on October 25, 2005, for Windows, November 15, 2005, for the Xbox 360, and June 13, 2006, for Mac OS X. Other versions were made for mobile phones, Pocket PCs, and smartphones.

==== Call of Duty 3 ====
Call of Duty 3 is a first-person shooter and the third installment in the Call of Duty video game series. Released on November 7, 2006, the game was developed by Treyarch, and was the first major installment in the Call of Duty series not to be developed by Infinity Ward. It was the first not to be released on the PC platform. It was released on the PlayStation 2, PlayStation 3, Wii, Xbox, and Xbox 360.

==== Call of Duty: WWII ====
Call of Duty: WWII is the fourteenth game in the series and was developed by Sledgehammer Games. It was released worldwide on November 3, 2017, for Windows, PlayStation 4 and Xbox One. The game is set in the European theatre, and is centered around a squad in the 1st Infantry Division, following their battles on the Western Front, and set mainly in the historical events of Operation Overlord.

==== Call of Duty: Vanguard ====
Call of Duty: Vanguard is the eighteenth game in the series and is developed by Sledgehammer Games, with Treyarch developing the game's Zombies mode. It was released on November 5, 2021, for PC, PlayStation 4, PlayStation 5, Xbox One and Xbox Series X/S. The story depicts the birth of special forces to face an emerging threat at the end of the war during various theaters of World War II.

=== Modern Warfare series ===
==== Original trilogy ====
===== Call of Duty 4: Modern Warfare =====
Call of Duty 4: Modern Warfare is the fourth installment of the main series and was the first game in the Modern Warfare timeline. Developed by Infinity Ward, it is the first game in the series not to be set during World War II. The game was released for Windows, Nintendo DS, PlayStation 3, and Xbox 360 on November 7, 2007. Download and retail versions for Mac OS X were released by Aspyr in September 2008. As of May 2009, Call of Duty 4: Modern Warfare has sold over 13 million copies.

====== Call of Duty: Modern Warfare Remastered ======
Call of Duty: Modern Warfare Remastered is a remastered version of Call of Duty 4: Modern Warfare that was released alongside the Legacy Edition, Legacy Pro Edition and Digital Deluxe Edition of Call of Duty: Infinite Warfare on November 4, 2016, for PlayStation 4, Xbox One, and PC. It was later released standalone on June 27, 2017, for PS4, and July 27, 2017, for Xbox One and PC. The game was developed by Raven Software and executive produced by Infinity Ward.

===== Call of Duty: Modern Warfare 2 =====
Call of Duty: Modern Warfare 2 is the sixth installment of the main series, and the second game in the Modern Warfare timeline. It was developed by Infinity Ward and published by Activision. Activision Blizzard announced Modern Warfare 2 on February 11, 2009. The game was released worldwide on November 10, 2009, for the Xbox 360, PlayStation 3 and Windows. A Nintendo DS iteration of the game, titled Call of Duty: Modern Warfare: Mobilized, was released alongside the game and the Wii port of Call of Duty: Modern Warfare. Modern Warfare 2 is the direct sequel to Call of Duty 4 and continues the same storyline, taking place five years after the first game and featuring several returning characters including Captain Price and "Soap" MacTavish.

====== Call of Duty: Modern Warfare 2 Campaign Remastered ======
A visually updated version of the original, it was released for PlayStation 4 on March 31, 2020, and for Xbox One and Windows on April 30, 2020. It only includes the campaign mode with no multiplayer and Spec Ops components. When purchased, players can unlock various cosmetic items in 2019's Call of Duty: Modern Warfare and 2020's Call of Duty: Warzone.

===== Call of Duty: Modern Warfare 3 =====
Call of Duty: Modern Warfare 3 is the eighth installment of the main series and the third installment of the Modern Warfare arc. Due to a legal dispute between the game's publisher Activision and the former co-executives of Infinity Ward – which caused several lay-offs and departures within the company – Sledgehammer Games assisted in the development of the game, while Raven Software was brought in to make cosmetic changes to the menus of the game. The game was said to have been in development since only two weeks after the release of Call of Duty: Modern Warfare 2. Sledgehammer was aiming for a "bug free" first outing in the Call of Duty franchise, and had also set a goal for Metacritic review scores above 95 percent.

The game continues the story from the point at which it ended in the Call of Duty: Modern Warfare 2 and continues the fictional battle story between the United States and Russia, which evolves into the Third World War between NATO allied nations and ultra-nationalist Russia.

==== Reboot ====
===== Call of Duty: Modern Warfare =====
Call of Duty: Modern Warfare is the sixteenth entry in the Call of Duty series and is also a reboot of the Modern Warfare sub-series. The story has been described to be darker and more realistic than previous Call of Duty games. It is set in the Black Ops timeline, separate from the other Modern Warfare games (however, characters such as Captain Price and others from the series make a return). The game was revealed on May 30, 2019, and released on October 25, 2019.

The second main battle royale installment in the Call of Duty franchise, titled Call of Duty: Warzone, was released in March 2020, as a part of the Call of Duty: Modern Warfare video game but does not require purchase of it. The title exceeded 50 million players in the first month after release.

===== Call of Duty: Modern Warfare II =====
On February 11, 2022, Activision confirmed that a sequel to the 2019 Modern Warfare game would be developed by Infinity Ward. The game's logo and title was revealed on April 28, 2022. During Activision's 'Call of Duty NEXT' broadcast on September 15, 2022, the game's multiplayer was fully revealed, along with details on the next version of Warzone and a mobile version of Warzone, both set to launch slightly after Modern Warfare II's launch.

Call of Duty: Modern Warfare II was released on October 28, with Campaign Early Access for pre-orders on October 20.

===== Call of Duty: Modern Warfare III =====
Call of Duty: Modern Warfare III is the twentieth entry in the Call of Duty series and the third installment of the rebooted Modern Warfare series. It was released on November 10th, 2023.

===== Call of Duty: Modern Warfare 4 =====
Call of Duty: Modern Warfare 4 was announced on May 28, 2026.

=== Black Ops series ===
==== Call of Duty: World at War ====
Call of Duty: World at War, developed by Treyarch, is the fifth installment of the main series. Released after Modern Warfare, it returns to the World War II setting of earlier titles, featuring the Pacific theater and Eastern front. The game uses the same proprietary game engine as Call of Duty 4 and was released for the PC, PlayStation 3, Wii, Xbox 360 consoles and the Nintendo DS handheld in North America on November 11, 2008, and November 14, 2008, in Europe. As of June 2009, Call of Duty: World at War has sold over 11 million copies. It acts as a prologue for Treyarch's next game, Black Ops, which is in the same universe, sharing characters and story references. It was also the first title to include the cooperative Zombies mode which would return in later editions of the series.

==== Call of Duty: Black Ops ====
Call of Duty: Black Ops is the seventh installment in the series, the third developed by Treyarch and was published by Activision for release on November 9, 2010. It is the first game in the series to take place during the Cold War and takes place partially in the Vietnam War. It was initially available for Windows, Xbox 360, and PlayStation 3 and was later released for the Wii as well as the Nintendo DS.

==== Call of Duty: Black Ops II ====
Call of Duty: Black Ops II is the ninth main installment in the series, developed by Treyarch and published by Activision. The game was revealed on May 1, 2012. It was the first game in the series to feature future warfare technology, and the campaign features multiple branching storylines driven by player choice and multiple endings. It was released on November 13, 2012.

==== Call of Duty: Black Ops III ====
Call of Duty: Black Ops III is the twelfth main installment in the series, developed by Treyarch and published by Activision. The game was released on November 6, 2015.

==== Call of Duty: Black Ops 4 ====
Call of Duty: Black Ops 4 is the fifteenth main installment in the series. It was developed by Treyarch and published by Activision. The game was released on October 12, 2018. It was the first featured Call of Duty game to forgo a single-player campaign game mode, focusing on the multiplayer aspect of the game. The game introduced an entirely new battle royale game mode, called Blackout, in addition to multiplayer and Zombies co-op mode.

==== Call of Duty: Black Ops Cold War ====
Call of Duty: Black Ops Cold War is the seventeenth main installment in the series. It was developed by Treyarch and Raven Software, and published by Activision. The game was released on November 13, 2020. Set during the 1980s and focusing on Soviet and American espionage during the Cold War, the game is chronologically set between Call of Duty: Black Ops and Black Ops II.

==== Call of Duty: Black Ops 6 ====
Call of Duty: Black Ops 6 is the 21st major work in the series. It was developed by Treyarch and Raven Software and released by Activision on October 25, 2024.

==== Call of Duty: Black Ops 7 ====
Call of Duty: Black Ops 7 is the 22nd major work in the series. It was developed by Treyarch and Raven Software and published by Activision. It was first revealed through a teaser trailer on June 8, 2025 and was released on November 14, 2025.

=== Standalone games ===
==== Call of Duty: Ghosts ====
Call of Duty: Ghosts is the tenth main installment in the series and was developed by Infinity Ward. The game was released on November 5, 2013. It was the first game to be developed for eighth generation consoles such as PlayStation 4 and Xbox One.

==== Call of Duty: Advanced Warfare ====
Call of Duty: Advanced Warfare is the eleventh main installment in the series, developed by Sledgehammer Games with assistance from Raven Software and High Moon Studios. It was released on November 4, 2014. The game was the first game in the series to feature advanced movements, such as double jump and boost slide.

==== Call of Duty: Infinite Warfare ====
Call of Duty: Infinite Warfare is the thirteenth main installment in the series, developed by Infinity Ward, and was published by Activision. The game was released on November 4, 2016.

== Primary developer rotation ==
In 2006, Treyarch released Call of Duty 3, their first Call of Duty game of the main series. Treyarch and Infinity Ward signed a contract stating that the producer of each upcoming title in the series would alternate between the two companies. In 2010, Sledgehammer Games announced they were working on a main series title for the franchise. This game was postponed to help Infinity Ward produce Modern Warfare 3. In 2014, it was confirmed that Sledgehammer Games would produce the 2014 title, Call of Duty: Advanced Warfare, and the studios would begin a three-year rotation. After Sledgehammer developed Call of Duty: WWII (2017), they began developing a new Call of Duty entry alongside Raven Software due for release in 2020. However, there were conflicts of interest between the two, which resulted in Treyarch taking over control of the project to speed up the development process.

== Free-to-play games ==
Free-to-play titles in the Call of Duty series
Title	Year	Platform	Status	Lead developer
Call of Duty Online	2012	Windows	Defunct	Raven Shanghai, Activision Shanghai Studio
Call of Duty: Heroes	2014	iOS, Android	Defunct	Faceroll Games
Call of Duty: Mobile	2019	iOS, Android	Active	TiMi Studio Group
Call of Duty: Warzone (2020)	2020	Windows, PS4, XONE	Defunct	Raven Software, Infinity Ward
Call of Duty: Warzone (2022)	2022	Windows, PS4, PS5, XONE, X|S	Active	Raven Software, Infinity Ward
Call of Duty: Warzone Mobile	2024	iOS, Android	Defunct	Digital Legends Entertainment, Beenox, Activision Shanghai Studio, Solid State Studios

=== Call of Duty Online ===
Call of Duty Online was announced by Activision when the company first stated their interest in a Massively multiplayer online game (MMO) in early 2011. By then, it had been in development for two years. Call of Duty Online is free-to-play for mainland China and is hosted by Tencent, since Activision had lost the publishing rights to Call of Duty and several other franchises in China due to a legal dispute on most of the gaming consoles (Xbox 360, PlayStation 3, and Wii).

=== Call of Duty: Heroes ===
Call of Duty: Heroes was a real-time strategy game developed by Faceroll Games and published by Activision for Android and iOS.

=== Call of Duty: Mobile ===
Call of Duty: Mobile is the franchise's mobile title for iOS and Android developed by Tencent Games' TiMi Studios. It was released globally on October 1, 2019. Previously, it was first announced on March 18, 2019, at the year's Game Developers Conference. As of October 4, 2019, the game has surpassed over 35 million downloads worldwide.

=== Call of Duty: Warzone (2020) ===
Call of Duty: Warzone is an online battle royale game developed by Infinity Ward and Raven Software and released by Activision. The game was released on March 10, 2020, as part of Modern Warfare (2019), but can be downloaded without ownership of the former title. The game shares progression with, and uses gameplay items from Modern Warfare, as well as Black Ops Cold War and Vanguard following several integration updates to incorporate content from these titles. Activision has announced that a mobile version of Warzone was in development, slated to be released sometime in the future.

=== Call of Duty: Warzone (2022) ===
A successor to Warzone, initially titled Call of Duty: Warzone 2.0, also developed by Infinity Ward and Raven Software, was released on November 16, 2022, as part of a content update for Modern Warfare II. Following its fourth seasonal update, Warzone 2.0 was renamed to simply Warzone. Like the previous iteration, Warzone (2022) is available for separate download without requiring ownership of Modern Warfare II, and was subsequently integrated with gameplay items and progression from Modern Warfare III. In addition to sharing progression with the aforementioned titles, the game is also linked to Warzone Mobile, a standalone mobile game that incorporates Modern Warfare II and Modern Warfare III gameplay items while played on separate maps and game modes.

=== Call of Duty: Warzone Mobile ===
Call of Duty: Warzone Mobile is a discontinued mobile battle royale game developed by Activision Shanghai, Beenox, Digital Legends Entertainment, and Solid State Studios, in partnership with other Activision studios. The game has cross-progression with Modern Warfare II, Modern Warfare III and Warzone 2.0 and uses their gameplay items but does not support cross-platform play with the aforementioned titles. The game was released on November 30, 2022, in Australia and March 24, 2023, in Chile, Norway and Sweden, as part of a "Limited Release" phase, with the first map being a ported version of Verdansk, which first appeared in the original Warzone. The game was officially released for iOS and Android devices on March 21, 2024.

== Spin-off games ==
Spin-off titles in the Call of Duty series
Title	Year	Platform	Lead developer
Console titles
Call of Duty: Finest Hour	2004	GCN, PS2, Xbox	Spark Unlimited
Call of Duty 2: Big Red One	2005	GCN, PS2, Xbox	Treyarch
Call of Duty: World at War – Final Fronts	2008	PS2	Rebellion Developments
Handheld titles
Call of Duty	2004	N-Gage	OmegaSoft
Call of Duty: Roads to Victory	2007	PSP	Amaze Entertainment
Call of Duty 4: Modern Warfare	2007	NDS	n-Space
Call of Duty: World at War	2008	NDS	n-Space
Call of Duty: Modern Warfare: Mobilized	2009	NDS	n-Space
Call of Duty: Black Ops	2010	NDS	n-Space
Call of Duty: Modern Warfare 3 – Defiance	2011	NDS	n-Space
Call of Duty: Black Ops: Declassified	2012	PS Vita	nStigate Games
Mobile titles
Call of Duty	2004	J2ME	Mforma
Call of Duty 2	2006	J2ME	Mforma
Call of Duty 3	2006	J2ME	Hands-On Mobile
Call of Duty 2 Pocket PC Edition	2007	Windows Mobile	IonFx
Call of Duty 4: Modern Warfare	2007	J2ME	Glu Mobile
Call of Duty: World at War	2008	J2ME	Glu Mobile
Call of Duty: Modern Warfare 2: Force Recon	2009	J2ME	Glu Mobile
Call of Duty: World at War – Zombies	2009	iOS	Ideaworks Game Studio
Call of Duty: Black Ops Mobile	2010	J2ME	Glu Mobile
Call of Duty: Black Ops – Zombies	2011	iOS, Android	Ideaworks Game Studio
Call of Duty: Strike Team	2013	iOS, Android	The Blast Furnace

=== Console titles ===
==== Call of Duty: Finest Hour ====
Call of Duty: Finest Hour is the first console installment of Call of Duty and was released on the GameCube, PlayStation 2, and Xbox. The PlayStation 2 and Xbox versions of the game include an online multiplayer mode which supports up to 32 players. It also includes new game modes.

==== Call of Duty 2: Big Red One ====
Call of Duty 2: Big Red One is a spin-off of Call of Duty 2 developed by Treyarch and based on the American 1st Infantry Division's exploits during World War II. The game was released on GameCube, PlayStation 2, and Xbox.

==== Call of Duty: World at War – Final Fronts ====
Call of Duty: World at War – Final Fronts is the PlayStation 2 adaptation of Call of Duty: World at War. Developed by Rebellion Developments, Final Fronts features three campaigns involving the U.S. fighting in the Pacific theater, the Battle of the Bulge, and the British advancing on the Rhine River into Germany.

=== Handheld titles ===
==== Call of Duty (for N-Gage) ====
Call of Duty is a N-Gage game which is a portable spin-off of 2003's Call of Duty.

==== Call of Duty: Roads to Victory ====
Call of Duty: Roads to Victory is a PSP game which is a portable spin-off of Call of Duty 3.

==== Call of Duty 4: Modern Warfare (for Nintendo DS) ====
Call of Duty 4: Modern Warfare is the Nintendo DS companion game for 2007's Modern Warfare.

==== Call of Duty: World at War (for Nintendo DS) ====
Call of Duty: World at War is the Nintendo DS companion game for World at War.

==== Call of Duty: Modern Warfare: Mobilized ====
Call of Duty: Modern Warfare: Mobilized is the Nintendo DS companion game for Modern Warfare 2. Developed by n-Space, the game takes place in the same setting as the main console game but follows a different storyline and cast of characters. Playing as the S.A.S. and the Marines in campaign mode, both forces are trying to find a nuclear bomb.

==== Call of Duty: Black Ops (for Nintendo DS) ====
Call of Duty: Black Ops is the Nintendo DS companion game for Black Ops. Developed by n-Space, the game takes place in the same setting as the main console game, but follows a different storyline and cast of characters.

==== Call of Duty: Modern Warfare 3 – Defiance ====
Call of Duty: Modern Warfare 3 – Defiance is the Nintendo DS companion game for Modern Warfare 3.

==== Call of Duty: Black Ops: Declassified ====
Call of Duty: Black Ops: Declassified is a PlayStation Vita Call of Duty game.

=== Mobile titles ===
==== Call of Duty (for Mobile) ====
Call of Duty is the J2ME mobile spin-off of 2003's Call of Duty.

==== Call of Duty 2 (for Mobile) ====
Call of Duty 2 is the J2ME mobile spin-off of Call of Duty 2.

==== Call of Duty 3 (for Mobile) ====
Call of Duty 3 is the J2ME mobile spin-off of Call of Duty 3.

==== Call of Duty 2 Pocket PC Edition ====
Call of Duty 2 Pocket PC Edition is the Windows Mobile spin-off of Call of Duty 2.

==== Call of Duty 4: Modern Warfare (for Mobile) ====
Call of Duty 4: Modern Warfare is the J2ME mobile spin-off of 2007's Modern Warfare.

==== Call of Duty: World at War (for Mobile) ====
Call of Duty: World at War is the J2ME mobile spin-off of World at War.

==== Call of Duty: Modern Warfare 2: Force Recon ====
Call of Duty: Modern Warfare 2: Force Recon is the J2ME mobile spin-off of Modern Warfare 2. Developed by Glu Mobile, the game takes place in Mexico five years after Modern Warfare.

==== Call of Duty: World at War – Zombies ====
Call of Duty: World at War – Zombies is a first-person shooter video game developed by Ideaworks Game Studio and published by Activision for iOS. It is a spin-off of the Call of Duty series and based on the "Nazi Zombies" mode of Call of Duty: World at War.

==== Call of Duty: Black Ops Mobile ====
Call of Duty: Black Ops Mobile is the J2ME mobile spin-off of Black Ops.

==== Call of Duty: Black Ops – Zombies ====
Call of Duty: Black Ops – Zombies is a first-person shooter video game developed by Ideaworks Game Studio and published by Activision for Android and iOS. It is a sequel to Call of Duty: World at War – Zombies.

==== Call of Duty: Strike Team ====
Call of Duty: Strike Team is a first and third-person shooter game developed by The Blast Furnace and published by Activision for iOS and Android. The game is set in 2020 with players tasked with leading a U.S. Joint Special Operations Team after the country "finds themselves in a war with an unknown enemy".

== Compilations ==
=== Call of Duty: The War Collection ===
Call of Duty: The War Collection is a boxed set compilation of Call of Duty 2, Call of Duty 3 and Call of Duty: World at War. It was released for the Xbox 360 on June 1, 2010.

== Canceled titles ==
=== Call of Duty: Combined Forces ===
Call of Duty: Combined Forces was a proposed concept draft originally intended to be a sequel to Call of Duty: Finest Hour. However, due to multiple legal issues that arose between Spark Unlimited, Electronic Arts, and Activision as well as other production problems, the game's draft and scripts never came to be. The game was projected to cost $10.5 million to produce after Finest Hour was complete. Eventually, Activision deemed the pitch as more of an expansion than something entirely new, causing the company to reject the proposal and end their contract with Spark Unlimited shortly after.

=== Call of Duty: Devil's Brigade ===
Call of Duty: Devil's Brigade was a canceled first-person shooter for the Xbox 360 developed by Underground Entertainment. The game was set in World War II, mainly focusing on the Italian Campaign.

=== Call of Duty: Future Warfare / NX1 ===
In 2010, after the fracturing of Infinity Ward and departure of Jason West and Vince Zampella, studio Neversoft was tasked by Activision to develop a sci-fi spinoff in the Call of Duty franchise, experimenting with low-gravity gameplay and other aspects of the engine. At an unknown point in time, the project was scrapped, and assets were reused in Ghosts and Infinite Warfare. Footage of the project (known as Future Warfare) was leaked online in January 2024, revealing a complete opening mission, and an in-development multiplayer that was still reusing assets from 2009's Modern Warfare 2. After the leaks, former Neversoft developer Brian Bright came along and confirmed the leaks, stating that the game had two or three complete missions, and a large amount of multiplayer work done. He also referred to the project as "NX1", and that the game was meant to be released in 2013 in place of Ghosts.

=== Call of Duty: Vietnam ===
Call of Duty: Vietnam was a third-person shooter set during the Vietnam War. It was in development for at least six to eight months at Sledgehammer Games. The development was stopped because Infinity Ward needed help finishing Call of Duty: Modern Warfare 3 due to the employee firings and departures in 2010.

=== Call of Duty: Roman Wars ===
Call of Duty: Roman Wars was a canceled third and first-person video game in the Call of Duty franchise developed by Vicarious Visions. The game was set in ancient Rome, and allowed players to take control of famous historical figure Julius Caesar, along with "low grunts", and officers of the Tenth Legion. It was eventually canceled, as Activision had uncertainties about branding it as a Call of Duty title.

=== Untitled Call of Duty Zombies game ===
Between 2012 and 2013, Raven Software was developing a stand-alone Call of Duty Zombies game, after Treyarch's internal decision to move from the traditional Black Ops Zombies mode and focusing on the single-player and multiplayer aspects of their next game, Call of Duty: Black Ops III (2015). Designed to be a free-to-play arena, the game was taking inspirations from the Mad Max movies. Former Raven's lead designer Michael Gummelt came along and confirmed the leaks in April 2024, and revealed that Raven canceled the project after Treyarch move back on the production of Black Ops Zombies and decided that Raven's game would create an internal competition.

== Other media ==
=== Comic books ===
Modern Warfare 2: Ghost is a six-part comic book mini-series based on Call of Duty: Modern Warfare 2. The storyline focuses on the backstory of the character Simon "Ghost" Riley. The series is published by WildStorm and the first issue was released on November 10, 2009, alongside the game.

Call of Duty: Zombies is a six-part comic book series published by Dark Horse Comics. The series ties in with the Zombies game mode of the Black Ops subseries developed by Treyarch. The series is co-written by Justin Jordan, Treyarch's Jason Blundell and Craig Houston. The series is illustrated by artist Jonathan Wayshak and colorist Dan Jackson. The cover arts are handled by artist Simon Bisley. The series was announced by Treyarch in July 2016, with the first issue slated for release in October. After a slight delay, the first issue was released on October 26, 2016. The five other issues were released in the months of 2017: issue #2 released on January 11, 2017; issue #3 released on March 1, 2017; issue #4 released on April 19, 2017; issue #5 released on June 21, 2017; and issue #6 released on August 23, 2017. A paperback edition containing all six issues was released on November 15, 2017.

=== Merchandise ===
In 2004, Activision, in cooperation with the companies Plan-B Toys and Radioactive Clown, released the "Call of Duty: Series 1" line of action figures, which included three American soldiers and three German soldiers from the World War II era. While the American G.I. action figure was made in 2004, Plan-B Toys later discontinued a controversial Nazi SS Guard action figure based on the Nazi Totenkopf officer seen in Call of Duty. In 2008, McFarlane Toys announced their partnership with Activision to produce action figures for the Call of Duty series. McFarlane Toys' first series of action figures were released in October 2008 and consists of four different figures: Marine with Flamethrower, Marine Infantry, British Special Ops, and Marine with Machine Gun.

=== Short films ===
Find Makarov is a fan-made film that was well received by Call of Duty publishers, Activision, who contacted We Can Pretend and subsequently produced a second short film, Operation Kingfish.

Find Makarov: Operation Kingfish is a fan-made prequel to Call of Duty: Modern Warfare 2 and was first shown at Call of Duty XP. The video was produced by We Can Pretend, with visual effects by The Junction, and was endorsed by Activision. The video tells the story of how Captain Price ended up in a Russian Gulag set before the events of Modern Warfare 2.

=== Films ===
On November 6, 2015, upon the release of Black Ops III, The Hollywood Reporter reported that Activision Blizzard launched a production studio called Activision Blizzard Studios and are planning a live action Call of Duty cinematic universe in 2019. On February 16, 2018, it was announced that Stefano Sollima will direct the film. Days later, he told Metro UK that he is considering having both Tom Hardy and Chris Pine as the leads for the film. In an interview with FilmSlash, Sollima stated that the film will be a real soldier movie, not a war movie. On November 27, 2018, it was announced that Joe Robert Cole will be writing the sequel. Filming of the first film was supposed to start in Spring 2019 for a 2020 or 2021 release. In February 2020, Sollima revealed in an interview that the film had been put on hold as it was not Activision's priority.

In September 2025, Paramount Pictures announced that they and Microsoft owned Activision have signed a deal that would see the studio develop, produce and distribute a live-action film based on the Call of Duty franchise. In October 2025, it was announced that Peter Berg had been attached to direct, with Taylor Sheridan co-writing the screenplay and co-producing with Berg. On April 15, 2026, it was announced that the film would be released on June 30, 2028. In July 2026, Berg confirmed that the film would take place in the Modern Warfare continuity.

== Esports ==
The Call of Duty games were used in esports, starting in 2008, alongside the game released at the time, Call of Duty 4: Modern Warfare. Over the years, the series has extended with releases such as Call of Duty: World at War, Call of Duty: Modern Warfare 2, Call of Duty: Black Ops, Call of Duty: Modern Warfare 3, Call of Duty: Black Ops II, Call of Duty: Ghosts, and Call of Duty: Mobile. Games are played in leagues like Major League Gaming.

Players can compete in ladders or tournaments. The ladders are divided into several sub ladders such as the singles ladder, doubles ladder, team ladder (3v3 – 6v6) and hardcore team ladder (3v3 – 6v6). The difference between the regular team ladder and the hardcore team ladder is the in-game settings and thus a rule differentiation. Winning ladder matches on a competitive website rewards the user with experience points which add up to give them an overall rank.

The tournaments offered on these websites provide players with the opportunity to win cash prizes and trophies. The trophies are registered and saved on the player's profile if/when they win a tournament, and the prize money is deposited into his or her bank account. Call of Duty: Ghosts was the most competitively played game in 2014, with an average of 15,000 teams participating every season.

For the past 6 seasons in competitive Call of Duty, Full Sail University has hosted a prize giveaway, giving $2,500 to the top team each season. The other ladders give out credits and medals registered on players' profiles. Tournaments hosted on the Call of Duty: Ghosts's Arena give cost from 15 to 30 credits, thus averaging at a cost of about $18.75 per tournament. If the player competes with a team, the prize money is divided, and an equal cut is given to each player. Other tournaments with substantial prizes are hosted in specific cities and countries for LAN teams.

The biggest Call of Duty tournament hosted was Call of Duty: Experience 2011, a tournament that began when Call of Duty: Modern Warfare 3 was released.

Playing Call of Duty competitively is most popular in Europe and North America, with users who participate in tournaments and ladder matches daily.

Activision launched a 12 team Call of Duty League, following a similar city-based franchise structure as the Overwatch League, in January 2020. The league's teams include those from Atlanta, Boston, the Carolinas, Las Vegas, Miami, Minnesota, New York, Seattle, Texas and Toronto, and with two teams from Los Angeles, the Los Angeles Thieves and Los Angeles Guerrillas.

== Call of Duty Endowment ==
The Call of Duty Endowment (CODE) is a nonprofit foundation created by Activision Blizzard to help find employment for U.S. military veterans. The first donation, consisting of $125,000, was presented to the Paralyzed Veterans of America.

Co-chairman General James L. Jones is a former U.S. National Security Advisor. Founder Robert Kotick is the CEO of Activision Blizzard. Upon its founding in 2009, the organization announced a commitment to create thousands of career opportunities for veterans, including those returning from the Middle East. Annual awards given by the endowment include the "Seal of Distinction", a $30,000 initial grant given to selected veteran's service organizations. In November 2014, the endowment launched the "Race to 1,000 Jobs" campaign to encourage gamers to donate money to and get involved in organizations that provide veterans with services. As of 2026, the Call of Duty Endowment had provided around $12 million in grants to veterans' organizations in the United States, which has helped find jobs for 180,000 veterans.

On March 30, 2010, CODE presented 3,000 copies of Call of Duty: Modern Warfare 2, approximately $180,000 in value, to the U.S. Navy. The copies were delivered to over 300 ships and submarines as well as Navy Morale, Welfare, and Recreation facilities worldwide.

== Criticism, controversies, and legal actions ==
=== Accusations of stereotyping and Western bias ===
The Call of Duty series has been the subject of criticism for its "western-centric worldview, clumsy stereotyping and fetishisation of military power", according to The Guardian's Keith Stuart. Writing for GameSpot, Phil Hornshall said the series "usually comes off as pro-gun and pro-military at the very least, and even jingoistic." Sam Biddle of The New Yorker wrote that the series maintains "massive bipartisan appeal" owing to its "reactionary nature". He criticized Activision Blizzard's claim that the games were apolitical, writing they "now pushed so deeply into the territory of right-wing fantasy that it reaches a point of inadvertent parody". Similarly, PC Gamer's Tyler Wilde criticized Sledgehammer's claim that Call of Duty: WWII promoted an anti-war viewpoint and that playing as a virtual soldier could increase empathy; he felt through the game's announcement trailer it instead glorified a "brutal but noble" conflict in a game series that was no deeper than an action drama.

Others have faulted Call of Duty's representation of ethnic and religious groups. Kotaku's Alyssa Mercante, alongside several Muslim and Arab members of the games industry, thought the series "historically dehumanize[s]" the aforementioned groups with harmful stereotypes and narratives. This included portraying the Middle East as undesirable where "the line between truth and fiction can blur", and creating localized fictional regions in a way that "perpetuat[es] the idea that there is a singular, Middle Eastern country". Inverse's Gregory Lawrence felt that Call of Duty avoided accusations of Islamophobia by including "good" Muslim characters, but without further exploring their morality. Writing for The Progressive, Joe Mayall thought that the games' depiction of its antagonists as anti-Western was a "dangerous oversimplification", the same attitude of which had led to the United States' (US) participation in wars.

A perceived strong Western bias in the series has been a point of criticism. TheGamer's Tessa Kaur condemned its portrayal of war that she thought depicted U.S. soldiers as heroes while having "no moral quandary", being "distinctively pro-intervention", and "perpetuat[ing] false beliefs" about real-world conflicts. Kaur questioned if the games could ever move beyond glorifying the U.S. military to tell "impactful and honest stories about the cruelty of war". Mayall wrote Call of Duty "exaggerates the effectiveness and cleanliness of militarism while understating the repercussions", leaving audiences with a heavily skewed version of reality. He felt this did the most harm by portraying military intervention as the best form of foreign policy. Conversely, Lawrence thought that the series had a surprising indifference in presenting the U.S. military favorably; he cited the rebooted Modern Warfare sub-series involving player-characters serving "corrupt masters embedded in a corrupt operation run by more corrupt masters".

Some have linked the sensed partiality with the U.S. government's military–entertainment complex. Kaur wrote Call of Duty was one example of entertainment media the authorities had exploited since World War II to promote certain narratives in their favor; Mayall wrote the Pentagon had consulted on "more than a thousand movies and dozens of video games". Alan MacLeod, a writer on the subject of propaganda, suggested that Call of Duty: Modern Warfare II was a "psychological operation" for the US. Affiliations between Call of Duty staff and the U.S. government have been felt to contribute to this. In an interview with The Guardian, Call of Duty: Black Ops II writer Dave Anthony said how he was contacted by a former Pentagon official to join an expert panel to discuss the future of warfare. He consequently joined a Washington-based think tank that advises on the future of unknown conflicts and threats. Similarly, while plotting Call of Duty: Advanced Warfare, Michael Condrey of Sledgehammer Games revealed the studio had consulted with a Pentagon advisor to discuss the likeliest future military threat to the US. Some wrote of how Call of Duty had also been used as a recruitment tool by the U.S. military. Kaur said they had once considered plans to grow its audience by paying Call of Duty streamers and organizing esports tournaments involving soldiers and streamers; they had backed out when reports of sexual harassment at Activision Blizzard were publicized.

=== Fallout with Infinity Ward leadership ===
As Infinity Ward's founders Jason West and Vince Zampella started new contract negotiations to continue developing the Call of Duty Activision around 2007, a number of legal issues arose between Infinity Ward and Activision. Ultimately, West and Zampella were forced out of Infinity Ward, later forming Respawn Entertainment within Electronic Arts. West and Zampella, as well as several Infinity Ward staff that departed the studio alongside them to join Respawn, filed lawsuits against Activision related to unpaid royalties and bonuses.

=== No Russian ===
Modern Warfare 2 received significant controversy due to its inclusion of the level "No Russian", in which the player participates in a massacre of civilians at a Russian airport.

=== Trademark infringement claims by AM General ===
AM General, the manufacturer of the Humvee, sued Activision in 2017 for using the Humvee in multiple Call of Duty games. A federal district judge gave Activision a summary motion in its favor to dismiss the case in April 2020, stating that the purpose of the use of the Humvee in the games, to provide military realism, was quite different from the trademark purpose that AM General had established, for selling to the military.
