= Call of Duty: World at War (Nintendo DS) =

2008 video game

- North American box art
- Developer: n-Space
- Publisher: Activision
- Series: Call of Duty
- Platform: Nintendo DS
- Release: NA: November 11, 2008; EU: November 14, 2008; AU: November 26, 2008
- Genre: First-person shooter
- Modes: Single-player, multiplayer

Call of Duty: World at War is a first-person shooter video game in the Call of Duty franchise, released for the Nintendo DS. It was released by Activision, alongside the console versions of the game, in November 2008. The game takes place during World War II and features many elements of gameplay typical to the series, including vehicular missions and the usage of iron sights.

== Gameplay ==
Screenshot of the game

Gameplay and controls in World at War remain similar to Modern Warfare. The directional pad controls movement. The touch screen is utilized for aiming, as well as switching and reloading weapons, and several minigames. The shoulder buttons are used to fire whatever weapon is equipped. The player double-taps the touch screen, or taps an icon on the touch screen, to go in and out of "aim-down sight" mode, which uses the weapon's iron sights to aim more accurately.

The game includes a campaign with a series of missions based in World War II's Pacific Ocean theater of World War II and Eastern front with American, British and Soviet campaigns. Missions are chronological and often sequential. World at War offers a quick play mode that lets the player access any mission they have won in the campaign.

World at War features console-style achievements, where the player receives an award for accomplishing a specific feat during gameplay, such as finishing a campaign or killing a certain number of enemies. There are also "collectables", star-shaped pickups, hidden in each mission. A challenge mode exists in which the player must complete a level segment in a limited time while fulfilling special goals such as scoring a certain number of grenade and melee kills.

Compared to the previous title developed by N-Space, World at War had improved in-level geometry, more responsive sprints and crouches, and 3D-modeled iron sights. The game runs at 30 frames per second.

There are several "minigames" based on real tasks undertaken in the field. Touchscreen-based minigames place the player in charge of defusing mines, sending Morse code radio messages, and bandaging wounded allies, as well as rotating wheels to aim mortar and artillery weapons. The player mans additional emplacements including machine-gun turrets and anti-aircraft guns. There is a parachuting segment of one mission. There are also tank levels in which player controls the tank's turret and machine-gun.

World at War includes online multiplayer as well as local multiplayer. Up to four players can be supported online with four different types of game. No perks or multiplayer rank-ups are included in the game, nor does the game have a zombie mode from its console counterparts; the first and only Call of Duty DS game to have such a mode would be Black Ops.

== Plot ==
The plot revolves around USMC Private Rook, Soviet Army Private Dimarkurato, and SAS Private Owen Pasley. The game roughly follows the same battles as the console version, but from a different perspective. It starts off at a boot camp, where Rook learns how to climb obstacles, fire accurately and use a mortar. Soon after that, he is shipped out to the Makin Atoll of the Gilbert Islands, where they destroy the Japanese cliff guns. Rook's plot continues on Peleliu Island. On approach, Japanese Zeros attack the landing craft and Rook defends it with the machine gun. They proceed to destroy the cliff gun and take an enemy airfield. The following two missions follow Rook as he fights in Bloody Nose Ridge and the caves inside it.

The campaign jumps to Holland where Pvt. Dawkins is a bombardier on a Lancaster bomber. Dawkins participates in a bombing mission. As his plane returns home German planes relentlessly attack, forcing him to bail out. The next mission starts with him and his squad parachuting into a field. They capture the nearby town and destroy a Panzer tank and an AA emplacent, followed by a supply line in the next mission. The final mission of this arc has Dawkins and his squad defending a town against German tanks.

The story continues to the Russian Dimarkurato as he is ready to raid Seelow Heights. He mans a ML21 artillery piece and destroys three houses and two Panzers. German troops raid the trenches, but Dimarkurato takes a bridge leading into Seelow Heights. The Red Army enters the city and Dimarkurato is told to destroy a MG-42 nest and kill three elite snipers. After he does this T-34 support the ground troops. The next mission has Dimarkurato commanding a tank after his captain shoots the previous commander. Using the tank he clears out more of the city. The following mission has Dimarkurato clearing out the final resistance in Seelow Heights.

The campaign goes back to Dawkins as he and his squad go to retrieve supplies that missed the drop zone in the Rhineland. He provides sniper cover for his squad as they save a tank from the Germans. In the next mission Dawkins commands the tank as it destroys the German resistance in the town. He then captures a bridge that the Germans are trying to destroy. The SAS is victorious and move in to destroy the final German resistance in the Rhineland.

The story returns to Pvt. Dimarkurato, who is making an assault on Berlin. His first job is to destroy three factories: Stuka, ammunition, and Panzer. After he does this, he and his squad head to a secret facility to steal nuclear secrets and then destroy the facility. After that, he mans the gun on a half-track as it flees through the streets of Berlin. Before the half-track reaches the Reichstag, a Stuka crashes into a building, blocking the road. The final Soviet mission has Dimarkurato helping secure the building.

The game jumps back to the Pacific theater as Rook is on board a transport headed for Okinawa. He mans an anti-aircraft gun and drives away the Japanese planes that fill the sky. This completed, he takes part in the battle for the island. The final mission of the game has Rook making an assault on Shuri Castle. His first job is to take out the AA guns around the castle. After he does this, he attacks the main part of the castle. He fights to the roof where he raises the American flag signaling the end of the battle.

== Reception ==
Reception

Aggregate score
Aggregator	Score
Metacritic	75/100

Review scores
Publication	Score
1Up.com	A
Eurogamer	8/10
GamesMaster	82%
GameSpot	8/10
GamesRadar+	7/10
GameZone	8/10
IGN	8.3/10
NGamer	78%
Nintendo World Report	9/10
Official Nintendo Magazine	83%

The Nintendo DS version received an average score of 75 out of 100 based on 12 reviews on Metacritic, indicating "generally favorable reviews".

IGN scored Call of Duty: World at War version at 8.3/10, praising elements including a surprising level of complexity for the hardware, "impressive sound production all around", fun gameplay and great multiplayer. Criticism of the game notes some minor glitches and the absence of a way to communicate online. GameSpot scored the game 8.0/10, praising technical achievements of the engine and audio which "... deliver the true Call of Duty experience".
