= Call of Duty: Strike Team =

2013 video game

- Developer: The Blast Furnace
- Publisher: Activision
- Series: Call of Duty
- Engine: Unity
- Platforms: iOS; Android
- Release: September 5, 2013
- Genres: First-person shooter, Real-time strategy
- Mode: Single-player

Call of Duty: Strike Team was a 2013 tactical shooter game developed by The Blast Furnace and was released on iOS and Android on September 5, 2013.

== Gameplay ==
Players have the option to switch from a first-person view to an overhead drone’s perspective. From the sky, players can command their squad to find cover, toss frags, fire and even secure objectives. This mode introduces strategic gameplay while enhancing tactics of positioning and map awareness. Strike Team makes use of the touch screens available on iOS and Android devices by allowing players to control their squad with a few simple gestures on screen. The left and right sides of the screen acts as virtual analog sticks for movement while playing in the first-player perspective. Furthermore, the game features quick aim via the small arrows placed on the bottom of the screen used to switch between targets. Tapping on one of the arrows brings the aiming reticule to the closest target.

=== Campaign mode ===
The game is set in the Black Ops story arc, in 2020, with players leading a U.S. Joint Special Operations Team after the country "finds itself in a war with an unknown enemy". The single player experience provides the similar feeling of previous Call of Duty games. The campaign consists of objective-based missions, where players control strike teams that are sent on particular missions to retrieve intel, eliminate targets or to take control of a specific area. Players are able to switch out gear and weapons or upgrade perks (which grant enhancements) between missions. Perks are upgradable via in game currency earned through missions, or through in-app purchases.

The game does not come with a multiplayer mode. Also, the campaign has 16 missions in 3 different locations to explore as you progress through the game.

=== Survival mode ===
Survival Mode in Strike Team plays the same way as Modern Warfare 3's Survival Mode. Players must fight off infinite waves of AI controlled enemies on the 3 maps included with the game, with more available for purchase. The game mode increases in difficulty as players progress through waves. Upon completing a wave, XP is rewarded based on the performance of the player, which can be used to purchase either ammunition or upgraded weapons and armour.

=== Time Attack mode ===
A new game mode for the game which was available as a free update on November 21, 2013, for those who already purchased the game. Time Attack mode puts the player in any of the already available maps, and sends out AI controlled enemies. Players must fight off enemy forces, while keeping an eye on the clock. Killing enemies reward players with more time on the clock, with the objective of staying alive as long as possible while earning tokens.

=== Domination mode ===
A new game mode for the game was available as a free update on December 19, 2013 (only for IOS users), for those who already purchased the game. The new game mode was available to play on all of the Strike Team maps. The objective is to capture and hold three strategic points on the map for a set amount of time while holding off a huge number of enemy forces. The longer the player survives, the more deadly the enemies become as they force their way into the game map to try to recapture the markers.

== Reception ==
Reception

Aggregate score
Aggregator	Score
Metacritic	71/100

Review scores
Publication	Score
Edge	5/10
Game Informer	5/10
GamesMaster	56%
Gamezebo	3.5/5
IGN	6/10
Pocket Gamer	3.5/5
TouchArcade	4.5/5
Digital Spy	4/5
Metro	5/10

Call of Duty: Strike Team received "mixed or average reviews" according to the review aggregation website Metacritic. IGN's Brian Albert gave the game positive points on its tactical view option, and constant unlocks of upgraded weaponry. However, Strike Team's clumsy shooting, difficult squad control, and jumbled story was a disappointment in his eyes. Albert wrote, "In trying to please both mobile and console audiences, Call of Duty: Strike Team fails to reach either."
