= Call of Duty: Heroes =

2014 video game

- Developer: Faceroll Games
- Publisher: Activision
- Series: Call of Duty
- Engine: Unity
- Platforms: Android; iOS
- Release: WW: November 26, 2014
- Genre: Real-time strategy
- Modes: Single-player, multiplayer

Call of Duty: Heroes was a free-to-play real-time strategy game published by Activision and developed by Faceroll Games as part of the Call of Duty video game series. The game was released on Android and iOS on November 26, 2014. On October 23, 2018 Activision announced that the game would no longer be available to play from December 22, 2018, going forward.

== Gameplay ==
Call of Duty: Heroes is a real-time strategy game with similar gameplay to Clash of Clans. Players take control of an army of soldiers called "Units" and also called "Heroes" to help, to destroy enemy bases. While Heroes can be controlled to an extent in that they can be moved, Units can't be controlled, except for the fact that the player can choose where to place their units. Also, Heroes get their own killstreaks to use, such as the Predator Missile, Chopper Gunner, and EMP.

Players also must build up their own base with defenses and structures so that it is protected from intruders. Gold and Oil are used to buy these things, as well as other things like a "shield" to protect the player's base for a certain amount of time, usually for a number of days. At the start of playing, the player automatically receives a shield for their base for free for several hours. However, shields expire automatically if a player plays a PvP match.

=== Buildings ===
To earn and store gold & oil, players must build gold mines & gold storage, oil depots & oil pumps and diamond mines & diamond depots, respectively. Golds can be used to upgrade any building, which can increases the building's health and unlocking new features. Golds & Oils can also be used to build defenses like Sentry Gun, SAM Turret, Howitzer, & Guardian Turret

=== Troops ===
The game has two kinds of compound (Training Compound & Machine Compound) and two kinds of facility (Ballistics Lab & Technology Facility).

== Featured characters ==
- John Price (Call of Duty: Modern Warfare series)
- John "Soap" Mactavish (Call of Duty: Modern Warfare series)
- Wallcroft (Call of Duty: Modern Warfare series)
- Simon "Ghost" Riley (Call of Duty: Modern Warfare 2)
- Yuri (Call of Duty: Modern Warfare 3)
- Edward Richtofen (Call of Duty: Black Ops series)
- Mike Harper (Call of Duty: Black Ops II)
- Raul Menendez (Call of Duty: Black Ops II)
- Reaper (Call of Duty: Black Ops III)
- Outrider (Call of Duty: Black Ops III)
- Riley (Call of Duty: Ghosts)
- Ilona (Call of Duty: Advanced Warfare)
- Gideon (Call of Duty: Advanced Warfare)
- ETH.3n (Call of Duty: Infinite Warfare)
- Ronald "Red" Daniels (Call of Duty: WWII)
- Camille "Rousseau" Denis (Call of Duty: WWII)
