= Call of Duty: Modern Warfare 3 – Defiance =

2011 video game

- North American box art
- Developer: n-Space
- Publisher: Activision
- Director: Ted Newman
- Producer: Jaime Wojick
- Designer: Brian Parker
- Composer: Geoff Zanelli
- Series: Call of Duty
- Platform: Nintendo DS
- Release: NA: November 8, 2011; PAL: November 8, 2011
- Genre: First-person shooter
- Modes: Single-player, multiplayer

Call of Duty: Modern Warfare 3 – Defiance is a 2011 first-person shooter video game in the Call of Duty franchise, developed by n-Space for the Nintendo DS. The game takes place in the same setting as Call of Duty: Modern Warfare 3 and features many elements of gameplay typical to the series, including the usage of iron sights, vehicular missions, and online play. It is the last Call of Duty game to be rated T for Teen by the ESRB. It is also the last Call of Duty game to be released on the Nintendo DS.

== Gameplay ==
The game features similar first-person shooter gameplay found in its predecessors. However, the lower screen status display has been updated with new functions including the ability to draw a knife without first moving into melee range of an opponent.

The game offers three different single player modes, including Campaign, Quick Play, and Challenge Mode. Campaign mode features a storyline taking place over 14 different missions, with three different difficulties, Recruit, Regular, and Hardened. Quick Play is a mode where players can complete each individual mission in any order. Completing the campaign is necessary to unlock all of the missions. Quick Play also features the same three difficulties. Challenge Mode consists of 10 missions, each of which has a goal, such as “Get 15 kills with 75% accuracy,” as from Challenge 08. It does not have a difficulty selection, as the challenges get harder as players progress.

The game also has two Multiplayer modes, Local MP and Online Multiplayer. Local MP is a mode where players can play against other people in their general area, and up to 6 people can join in one game. The modes are Death Match, Team Death Match, Sabotage, Gun Game, Sharpshooter, and One in the Chamber. Either the Russian Soldier or US Marine are playable in any games with teams. In Online Multiplayer, players can play any of the modes listed above against other players online.

In MP Barracks, players can edit Macros or edit Loadouts. Macros are map setups that are saved to the cartridge, which include the map, time limit, score limit, etc. that are usable in Local MP. Loadouts, for Local MP and Online Multiplayer, consist of a primary weapon, secondary weapon, grenade, perk 1, perk 2, and title.

== Plot ==
Defiance does not follow the same storyline as Call of Duty: Modern Warfare 3. Like the previous Nintendo DS Call of Duty games, the storyline serves as a "companion narrative" to the console and PC versions.

The game opens with the U.S. National Guard force training in Alaska at the time of the Russian invasion that takes place halfway through Call of Duty: Modern Warfare 2. The National Guard works in conjunction with the British SFSG cross-training in the United States to resist the Russians, including holding the town of Wilton against the Russians, and securing the Trans-Alaska Pipeline System from capture.

The action then shifts to the Arizona/Nevada border, and the fighting at the Hoover Dam and surrounding Henderson, Nevada. A British force assaults the dam via helicopter, and manage to save generators powering the Nevada side, but are killed when the generators on the Arizona side are destroyed, leaving Arizona's power supply crippled.

The final part of the game takes place in Baltimore, where the National Guard and SFSG reclaim Baltimore/Washington International Airport taken by the Russian forces, and fight through the Baltimore seaport and learn that the Russians have moved a WMD into the U.S., and are moving the weapon to a combat zone. The teams race through the port, fighting their way aboard a cargo ship where the Russians are offloading the weapon. The National Guard team makes it to the deck of the cargo vessel just as a Russian Hind helicopter carrying the weapon takes off. The teams manage to bring down the helicopter with an RPG, and the game ends as the player's C.O. states, "Now the real fight begins", referring to World War III in Modern Warfare 3.

== Multiplayer ==
Defiance features a multiplayer mode that has been significantly improved over its predecessors, featuring the ability for players to create and save weapon loadouts, grenade options, titles and perks. Weapons are unlocked when the player had made a specified number of kills with a similar weapon, in a functionality similar to the earlier handheld Call of Duty games. Additionally, players may change loadouts whenever they respawn. Similarly, players may preset map options, and run them instantly when host.

Online multiplayer modes are no longer available due to the shutdown of Nintendo Wi-Fi Connection services in May 2014.

== Reception ==
Reception

Aggregate score
Aggregator	Score
Metacritic	57/100

Review scores
Publication	Score
Nintendo World Report	6/10
Official Nintendo Magazine	70%

The game received mixed reviews. Official Nintendo Magazine's Chris Scullion states that the game was "not without its flaws but an impressive shooter given the limitations of the hardware." James Dawson of Nintendo World Report wrote that "Call of Duty: Modern Warfare 3: Defiance isn't going to win any awards, but as a DS port of a popular franchise, it does a decent job making the experience portable".
