= White Night (video game) =

2015 video game

- Developer: OSome Studio
- Publishers: Activision, Playdigious (Android, iOS), Plug In Digital (Switch)
- Director: Ronan Coiffec
- Producer: Mathieu Fremont
- Designer: Ronan Coiffec
- Programmer: Domenico Albani
- Artist: Ronan Coiffec
- Writer: Sébastien Renard
- Composers: Zachary Miskin; Elsa Quignard
- Platforms: Linux, Microsoft Windows, PlayStation 4, OS X, Xbox One, Android, iOS, Nintendo Switch
- Release: 3 March 2015: Xbox One; 6 March 2015; Android, iOS; 15 November 2017; Switch; 17 May 2018
- Genres: Survival horror, puzzle
- Mode: Single-player

White Night is a 2015 survival horror puzzle video game developed by French indie studio OSome Studio, and published by Activision. On 3 March 2015, it was released on Linux, OS X and Windows, and was later released on Xbox One on 6 March 2015.

== Development ==
White Night started in 2010, when its lead developer was working on a remake of Alone in the Dark. During this time, he became interested with the idea of putting black and white into a survival horror game. The team built the engine from scratch and found it gratifying to see it play out on various consoles. They enjoyed working with Activision, and appreciated the resources that partnership came with, for instance them showing the game off to the media. They had free rein in their creative decision, and while Activision offered tips on where to improve; money was no issue.

== Design and gameplay ==
The game has a monochromatic graphical style. Its slow jazz piano soundscape is reminiscent of classic noir thrillers. The narrative is told to the player via "voice-over, on-screen text, and journal entries".

== Plot ==
The game takes place within Vesper Mansion, where the player aims to solve a mystery. After having a car crash, the 30-something-year-old protagonist finds himself stumbling into what appears at first glance to be an abandoned mansion.

== Reception ==
Reception

Aggregate score
Aggregator	Score
Metacritic	PC: 68/100; PS4: 67/100; XONE: 61/100

Review scores
Publication	Score
Adventure Gamers	4/5
Computer Games Magazine	8/10
Destructoid	7.5/10
Game Informer	7.5/10
GameSpot	6/10
IGN	5.0/10
Nintendo Life	7/10
PC Gamer (US)	50/100
Push Square	6/10
VideoGamer.com	6/10

IGN praised the title's atmospheric and eerie atmosphere, though felt the aesthetic design compromised the title's exploration and puzzle-solving. Destructoid felt that the game falsely advertises itself as a "traditional survival experience of limited resources against considerable odds", whereas it just takes some gameplay elements of survival titles while centering on exploration mechanics. GameSpot made comparisons to Resident Evil due to its fixed camera angles.
