= Call of Duty 4: Modern Warfare (Nintendo DS) =

2007 video game

- Developer: n-Space
- Publisher: Activision
- Director: Bob Hitchcorn
- Producers: Michael S. Lee; Dan O'Leary
- Designers: Jaime Wojick; Thomas Sears; Brian Parker; Ryan Willis
- Composer: Karl Demer
- Series: Call of Duty
- Platform: Nintendo DS
- Release: NA: November 5, 2007; AU: November 7, 2007; EU: November 9, 2007
- Genre: First-person shooter
- Modes: Single-player, multiplayer

Call of Duty 4: Modern Warfare is a first-person shooter video game in the Call of Duty franchise, developed specifically for the Nintendo DS. It was released by Activision in November 2007. The game features many elements of gameplay typical to the series, including vehicular missions and the usage of iron sights.

The DS version was first shown at the E3 convention in July 2007, and one month later at the Games Convention. It received positive reviews, holding an average score of 76% based on 19 reviews on the review aggregator GameRankings, and was a top-seller in the United States.

== Gameplay ==
While most of the action takes place on the top screen, the bottom screen provides top-down view of the level and a compass with the objective location, while a UAV provides real-time radar scans of friendlies as well as enemies. The stylus is primarily used to aim weapons with precision detail, but players can also use soft buttons to select different weapons/grenades, toggle ADS (aim down sight), mount emplaced guns, and perform any mini-games on the screen.

As a first-person shooter, Modern Warfare puts the player in the role of various professional soldiers, with a focus exclusively on combat. The game offers a variety of real-world weapons and vehicles, including the M16A4, the AK-47, and the Uzi. The majority of the missions are ground-level infantry combat, but there are several missions in which the player mans a turret in an aircraft or Humvee.

The player looks around and aims the currently equipped weapon using the touch screen. On foot, the touch screen is also used to switch and reload firearms, switch to grenades, and interact with the game world; the directional pad is used to move and the shoulder buttons fire the current firearm.

To utilize unique features of the DS, this version includes several touch-screen features, including hacking terminals and bomb disarmament. Inventory controls and an overhead map and radar are located on the touch screen. The DS offers local multi-player via built-in wireless, but does not offer the online multiplayer central to the console and PC versions.

The game takes place in several settings, including the Middle East and Russia, during a fictionalized conflict involving a coup in an unnamed Arab nation. The game features twelve single player levels in its campaign, as well as several multiplayer modes including deathmatch, team deathmatch, and capture the flag. Multiplayer supports up to four players and uses both multi-card play and download play.

== Plot ==
The DS version of the game, as is standard for a Call of Duty title, allows the player to assume the roles of several soldiers, who are either affiliated with the British SAS (Snowman) or the U.S. Marines (Cpl. Zach Parker). Unlike the console and PC versions of the game, players do not directly influence the outcome of the war, but instead take part in missions that occur during the events of the main game, with a focus less on the main attempts to end the conflict and more on the supporting role of various other soldiers.

The game begins with Parker undergoing remedial training at a Marine outpost in the Persian Gulf, before the camp comes under attack from military forces loyal to Khaled Al-Asad, who has just seized power in a coup. Parker and the survivors evacuate and fight their way to a nearby city where they lay the groundwork for an invasion. Meanwhile, SAS units raid two ships in the Caspian Sea carrying supplies and nuclear material intended for Al-Asad, learning from captured documents that he is receiving assistance from ultranationalists engaged in a civil war in Russia.

Parker's unit is diverted from the attack on Al-Asad's capital city to hunt down the "Bagman", an associate of his with extensive knowledge of his trafficking network. The Bagman is captured, and reveals that a senior Ultranationalist named Petrovich is responsible for sending military aid to help Al-Asad plan his coup. The SAS goes on a mission, with Snowman providing sniper support, to raid Petrovich's safe house in Russia, and he is captured and interrogated, revealing the existence of a previously unknown military base and airfield where the Ultranationalists have been building up their forces.

On behalf of Russia's civilian government, Snowman and the SAS level the base with an AC-130 Spectre gunship providing support, recovering additional documents that indicate that the Ultranationalists are in possession of nuclear weapons. A raid is authorized on an abandoned industrial complex converted into a storage and transportation facility for nuclear bombs. One of the bombs is damaged and begins to detonate, but Snowman is able to disarm it in time.

The SAS and Marines form a joint task force after learning that Ultranationalist leader Imran Zakhaev has taken over a nuclear weapons base and is planning to launch warheads at the United States. Parker provides covering fire from the air and witnesses the launch of two missiles before joining a squad of Marines and SAS operators in a race against time to abort the launch. Ultimately, he manages to destroy one of the missiles in flight while the other is destroyed by a different squad, and helps secure the rest of the base's nuclear arsenal. While the squad makes their escape, Parker's vehicle is destroyed, and he obtains a new one in time to reach the extraction point before holding out long enough for air support to reach his location. The game ends with news that Zakhaev has been killed.

== Development ==
According to an interview with IGN before the DS version was first shown at the E3 convention in 2007, Activision said they worked on the game with n-Space since the fall of 2006. They were able to pack as much of the Call of Duty experience onto the DS as possible and were proud that there "are a ton of effects, but the environments are simply stunning." They also said that they were "excited about bringing Call of Duty to the DS for the first time." The game was later shown at the Games Convention one month later.

=== Audio ===
As with all games in the Call of Duty franchise, the music of the game was composed by Michael Giacchino recording the full orchestral scores live. Developer Infinity Ward reinforced those lofty standards with the help of composers Harry Gregson-Williams and Stephen Barton. Though Barton wrote most of the music featured in Call of Duty 4, IGN said that the score was "definitely a team effort."

== Reception ==
Reception

Aggregate score
Aggregator	Score
Metacritic	75/100

Review scores
Publication	Score
1Up.com	B+
Eurogamer	6 of 10
GamePro	3 of 5
GamesMaster	82%
GameSpot	7.0 of 10
GamesRadar+	6 of 10
GameZone	7.7 of 10
IGN	7.8 of 10
NGamer	67%
Nintendo World Report	9.0 of 10
Official Nintendo Magazine	83%

The Nintendo DS version received positive reviews, holding an average score of 75 out of 100 based on 22 reviews on Metacritic — indicating "generally favorable reviews".

IGN scored Call of Duty 4's DS version at 7.8/10, praising elements including a surprising level of complexity for the hardware, "impressive sound production all around", fun gameplay, and enjoyable multiplayer. Criticism of the game notes some minor glitches, the absence of an online multiplayer mode, and inconsistencies in damage between different weapons. GameSpot scored the game 7.0/10, praising technical achievements of the engine and audio which "... deliver the true Call of Duty experience". They also criticized the game's controls and lack of online multiplayer, noting "... the DS version doesn't offer any of the online modes that its console counterparts do, which means that your interest in the game will probably wane significantly after you complete that initial play-through."
