= Good Charlotte discography =

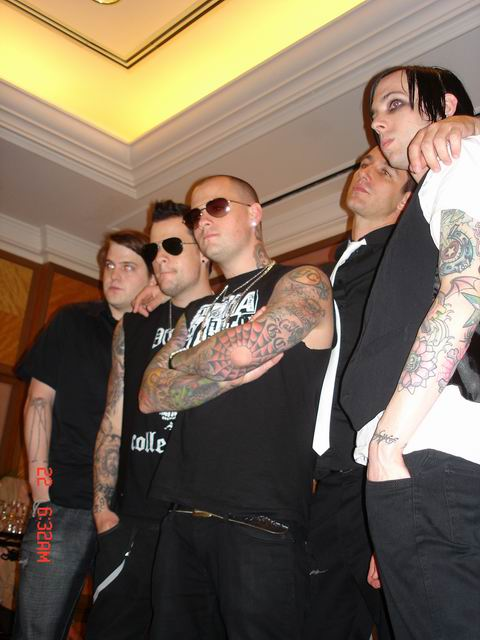
- From left to right: Paul Thomas, Joel Madden, Benji Madden, Dean Butterworth and Billy Martin.
- Studio albums: 8
- Extended plays: 5
- Compilation albums: 3
- Singles: 29
- Video albums: 3
- Music videos: 36
- Live albums: 1

The discography of Good Charlotte, an American rock band, consists of eight studio albums, two live albums, five extended plays, 29 singles, 35 music videos and three video albums.

Good Charlotte released their debut album, Good Charlotte, in September 2000 with their hit single "Little Things", which peaked at number 23 on the Billboard Modern Rock Tracks chart. Two more singles were released from the album: "The Motivation Proclamation" and "Festival Song". Their second album The Young and the Hopeless was released in 2002. The album produced five singles: "Lifestyles of the Rich and Famous", "The Anthem", "Girls & Boys", "The Young & the Hopeless" and "Hold On". The album went on to receive 4 Platinum certification from the RIAA. In October 2004, the band released their third album The Chronicles of Life and Death. Singles released from the album include "Predictable", "I Just Wanna Live", "The Chronicles of Life and Death" and "We Believe". Their fourth album, Good Morning Revival, was released in March 2007 and produced the singles "The River", "Keep Your Hands off My Girl" and "Dance Floor Anthem (I Don't Want to Be in Love)". Their fifth album, Cardiology, was released on November 2, 2010. "Like It's Her Birthday" was released as the first single from the album, followed by "Sex on the Radio" and "Last Night". In 2016 Good Charlotte released the album Youth Authority, followed by Generation Rx in 2018, and Motel Du Cap in 2025.

== Albums ==
=== Studio albums ===
List of studio albums, with selected chart positions and certifications
Title	Album details	Peak chart positions										Sales	Certifications
Title	Album details	US	AUS	AUT	CAN	GER	NL	NZ	SWE	SWI	UK	Sales	Certifications
Good Charlotte	Released: September 26, 2000; Label: Epic, Daylight; Formats: CD, CS, DL, LP	185	85	—	—	—	—	12	—	—	194	US: 500,000	RIAA: Platinum; BPI: Silver; RMNZ: Platinum
The Young and the Hopeless	Released: October 1, 2002; Label: Epic, Daylight; Formats: CD, CS, DD, DL, LP	7	9	20	7	37	57	6	7	46	15	WW: 5,000,000; US: 3,500,000	RIAA: 4× Platinum; ARIA: Platinum; BPI: Platinum; BVMI: Gold; MC: 2× Platinum; RMNZ: Platinum
The Chronicles of Life and Death	Released: October 5, 2004; Label: Epic, Daylight; Formats: CD, CS, DD, DL, LP	3	1	11	3	18	50	11	13	20	8	US: 1,100,000	RIAA: Platinum; ARIA: Platinum; BPI: Gold; BVMI: Gold
Good Morning Revival	Released: March 27, 2007; Label: Epic, Daylight; Formats: CD, CS, DL, LP	7	5	10	7	10	58	2	23	7	13	US: 314,000	RIAA: Gold; ARIA: Platinum; BPI: Silver; MC: Gold; RMNZ: Gold
Cardiology	Released: November 2, 2010; Label: Capitol; Formats: CD, DL	31	3	29	31	46	—	18	—	24	63	US: 52,000	ARIA: Gold
Youth Authority	Released: July 15, 2016; Label: MDDN; Formats: CD, DL, LP	23	1	15	23	17	77	15	—	8	13	US: 30,000; AUS: 3,883	
Generation Rx	Released: September 14, 2018; Label: MDDN, BMG; Formats: CD, DL, LP	164	24	29	80	42	—	—	—	32	31		
Motel Du Cap	Released: August 8, 2025; Label: Atlantic, MDDN; Formats: CD, DL, LP	—	47	—	—	—	—	—	—	71	—		
"—" denotes releases that did not chart or were not released in that country.

=== Compilation albums ===
List of compilation albums
Title	Album details	Peak chart positions		Certifications
Title	Album details	AUS	NZ	Certifications
Good Charlotte Box	Released: December 17, 2007; Label: Sony BMG; Formats: CD	66	—	
Greatest Remixes	Released: November 24, 2008; Label: Epic; Formats: CD, DL	—	—	
Greatest Hits	Released: November 5, 2010; Label: Sony Music, Epic, Daylight; Formats: CD, DL	41	31	BPI: Gold
"—" denotes releases that did not chart or were not released in that country.

=== Live albums ===
List of live albums
Title	Album details
Bootlegs	Released: September 7, 2004; Label: Epic; Formats: CD

== Extended plays ==
List of extended plays
Title	EP details
Demo	Released: 1996; Label: Self-released; Formats: CS
Good Charlotte	Released: 1997; Label: Self-released; Formats: CS
Another EP	Released: 1999; Label: Self-released; Formats: CD
GC EP	Released: 2000; Label: Self-released; Formats: CD
A GC Christmas, Pt. 1	Released: 2017; Label: MDDN; Formats: DL

== Singles ==
List of singles, with selected chart positions and certifications, showing year released and album name
Title	Year	Peak chart positions										Certifications	Album
Title	Year	US	US Pop	AUS	AUT	GER	NL	NZ	SWE	SWI	UK	Certifications	Album
"Little Things"	2000	—^{[A]}	—	61	—	—	—	—	—	—	—	RIAA: Gold	Good Charlotte
"The Motivation Proclamation"	2001	—	—	67	—	—	—	28	—	—	—		Good Charlotte
"Festival Song"	2001	—	—	—	—	—	—	—	—	—	—		Good Charlotte
"Lifestyles of the Rich and Famous"	2002	20	6	17	24	27	22	33	14	19	8	RIAA: Platinum; ARIA: Gold; BPI: Platinum; BVMI: Gold; RMNZ: Platinum	The Young and the Hopeless
"The Anthem"	2003	43	11	14	—	52	—	27	28	—	10	RIAA: 3× Platinum; ARIA: Gold; BPI: Platinum; RMNZ: Platinum	The Young and the Hopeless
"Girls & Boys"	2003	48	10	33	45	47	41	25	44	84	6	RIAA: Gold; BPI: Silver; RMNZ: Gold	The Young and the Hopeless
"The Young and the Hopeless"	2003	—	—	—	39	—	—	—	—	—	34		The Young and the Hopeless
"Hold On"	2003	63	17	—	18	67	—	—	—	—	34		The Young and the Hopeless
"Predictable"	2004	—^{[A]}	20	15	43	29	39	27	48	45	12		The Chronicles of Life and Death
"I Just Wanna Live"	2005	51	18	12	15	19	23	6	27	21	9	RIAA: Gold; ARIA: Gold	The Chronicles of Life and Death
"The Chronicles of Life and Death"	2005	—	—	31	50	65	—	—	—	47	30		The Chronicles of Life and Death
"We Believe"	2005	—	—	—	39	38	99	—	—	—	—		The Chronicles of Life and Death
"The River" (featuring M. Shadows and Synyster Gates)	2007	39	—	—	37	40	—	—	—	—	108	RIAA: Gold; BPI: Silver	Good Morning Revival
"Keep Your Hands off My Girl"	2007	—	—	5	29	32	—	20	49	27	23	ARIA: Gold	Good Morning Revival
"Dance Floor Anthem (I Don't Want to Be in Love)"	2007	25	16	2	—	—	—	11	—	—	—	RIAA: 2× Platinum; ARIA: Platinum; RMNZ: Gold	Good Morning Revival
"Misery"	2007	—	—	24	—	—	—	—	—	—	—		Good Morning Revival
"Where Would We Be Now"	2008	—	—	—	—	—	—	—	—	—	—		Good Morning Revival
"Like It's Her Birthday"	2010	—^{[A]}	33	7	—	—	—	34	—	—	—	ARIA: Platinum	Cardiology
"Sex on the Radio"	2010	—	—	26	—	—	—	—	—	—	—	ARIA: Platinum	Cardiology
"Last Night"	2011	—	—	27	—	—	—	—	—	—	—	ARIA: Platinum	Cardiology
"1979"	2011	—	—	62	—	—	—	—	—	—	—		Cardiology
"Makeshift Love"	2015	—	—	—	—	—	—	—	—	—	—		Youth Authority
"40 oz. Dream"	2016	—	—	—	—	—	—	—	—	—	—		Youth Authority
"Life Can't Get Much Better"	2016	—	—	51	—	—	—	—	—	—	—		Youth Authority
"Awful Things"	2017	—	—	—	—	—	—	—	—	—	—		Non-album single
"Actual Pain"	2018	—	—	—	—	—	—	—	—	—	—		Generation Rx
"Shadowboxer"	2018	—	—	—	—	—	—	—	—	—	—		Generation Rx
"Prayers"	2018	—	—	—	—	—	—	—	—	—	—		Generation Rx
"Last December"	2020	—	—	—	—	—	—	—	—	—	—		Non-album single
"Rejects"	2025	—	— (Note: "Rejects" did not enter the Pop Airplay chart, but peaked at number 11 on the Alternative Airplay chart.)	—	—	—	—	—	—	—	—		Motel Du Cap
"Stepper"	2025	—	—	—	—	—	—	—	—	—	—		Motel Du Cap
"Bedroom Posters" (with Yellowcard)	2026	—	— (Note: "Bedroom Posters" did not enter the Pop Airplay chart, but peaked at number 1 on the Alternative Airplay chart.)	—	—	—	—	—	—	—	—		Better Days
"U.R." (featuring Ziggy Marley)	2026	—	— (Note: "Bedroom Posters" did not enter the Pop Airplay chart, but peaked at number 39 on the Alternative Airplay chart.)	—	—	—	—	—	—	—	—		TBA
"—" denotes releases that did not chart or was not released.

Notes

- A. "Little Things", "Predictable", and "Like It's Her Birthday" peaked outside of the US Billboard Hot 100 chart, therefore they are listed on the Bubbling Under Hot 100 chart at number 16, 6 and 14 respectively.

== Video albums ==
Year	Information	Certifications
2003	Video Collection: Released: November 18, 2003	RIAA: Platinum; ARIA: Gold
2004	Live at Brixton Academy: Released: October 5, 2004	ARIA: Gold
2006	Fast Future Generation: Released: December 26, 2006	

== Music videos ==
Year	Title	Director(s)
2000	"Little Things"	Nigel Dick
2001	"The Motivation Proclamation"	Marc Webb
2001	"The Click"	David McGrath & Thomas McGrath
2001	"Festival Song"	Marc Webb
2002	"Lifestyles of the Rich and Famous"	Bill Fishman
2003	"The Anthem"	Smith N' Borin
2003	"Girls & Boys"	Smith N' Borin
2003	"The Young & the Hopeless"	Sam Erickson, and Benji & Joel Madden
2003	"Hold On"	Samuel Bayer
2004	"Predictable"	Smith N' Borin, and Benji & Joel Madden
2004	"I Just Wanna Live"	Brett Simon
2005	"The Chronicles of Life and Death"	Brett Simon
2005	"We Believe"	Sam Erickson
2006	"Keep Your Hands off My Girl" (white room version)	Marvin Scott Jarrett
2007	"The River"	Marc Webb
2007	"Keep Your Hands off My Girl" (club version)	Brian Lazzaro
2007	"Dance Floor Anthem (I Don't Want to Be in Love)"	Sean Michael Turrell
2010	"Like It's Her Birthday"	Josh Forbes
2011	"Sex on the Radio"	
2011	"Last Night"	Josh Martin
2011	"1979"	
2015	"Makeshift Love"	Jake Stark
2016	"40 Oz Dream"	Frank Borin
2016	"Life Can't Get Much Better"	Elijah Alvarado
2016	"Life Changes"	Elijah Alvarado
2017	"Keep Swingin'"	Elijah Alvarado
2017	"War"	Jake Stark
2018	"Actual Pain"	Jake Stark
2018	"Actual Pain" (Live)	Erik Rojas
2018	"Shadowboxer"	Jake Stark
2018	"Prayers"	Jake Stark
2018	"Self Help"	Jake Stark
2018	"Self Help" (Live)	Brian Cox
2020	"Last December"	
2025	"Rejects"	Erik Rojas and Lenna Onto
2025	"Stepper"	Erik Rojas
2025	"Mean"	Erik Rojas
2026	"Bedroom Posters"	Ryan Key
