= Dean Butterworth =

English drummer (born 1976)

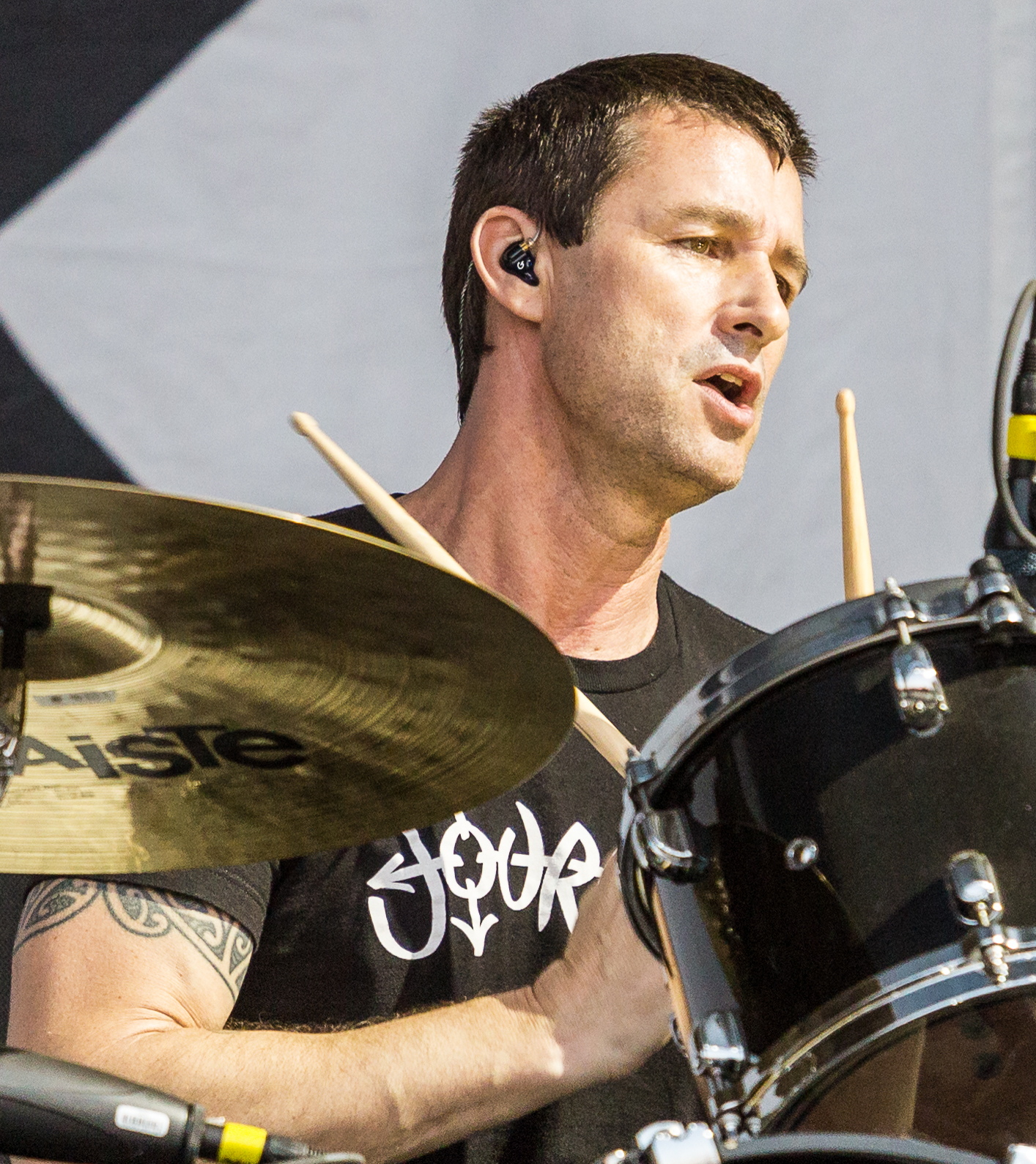
- Butterworth performing in 2017

Background information
- Born: September 26, 1976 (age 49); Rochdale, England
- Origin: Waldorf, Maryland, U.S.
- Genres: Pop-punk; pop rock; punk rock; alternative rock
- Occupation: Drummer
- Years active: 1986–present
- Member of: Sugar Ray
- Formerly of: Good Charlotte

Dean Butterworth (born 26 September 1976) is an English musician based in the United States. He was originally the drummer for Morrissey before joining Good Charlotte in 2005. Since 2016, he has also been the drummer for Sugar Ray. He left Good Charlotte in 2025.

He moved to the United States at the age of six and began learning to play the drums at thirteen.

He also recorded in the studio for Lies for the Liars, an album by the post-hardcore band The Used, although he was only in the studio.

== Discography ==
=== With Ben Harper ===
- The Will to Live (1997)
- Burn to Shine (1999)

=== With Morrissey ===
- You Are The Quarry (2004)

=== With Good Charlotte ===
- Good Morning Revival (2007)
- Greatest Remixes (2008)
- Cardiology (2010)
- Youth Authority (2016)
- Generation Rx (2018)

=== With The Used ===
- Lies for the Liars (2007)
- Shallow Believer (Only tracks 1–3, 5, 7–8, and 10–11) (2008)

=== Cute Is What We Aim For ===
- Rotation (2008)

=== Sugar Ray ===
- Little Yachty (2019)
