= Daniel Martin Diaz =

American painter

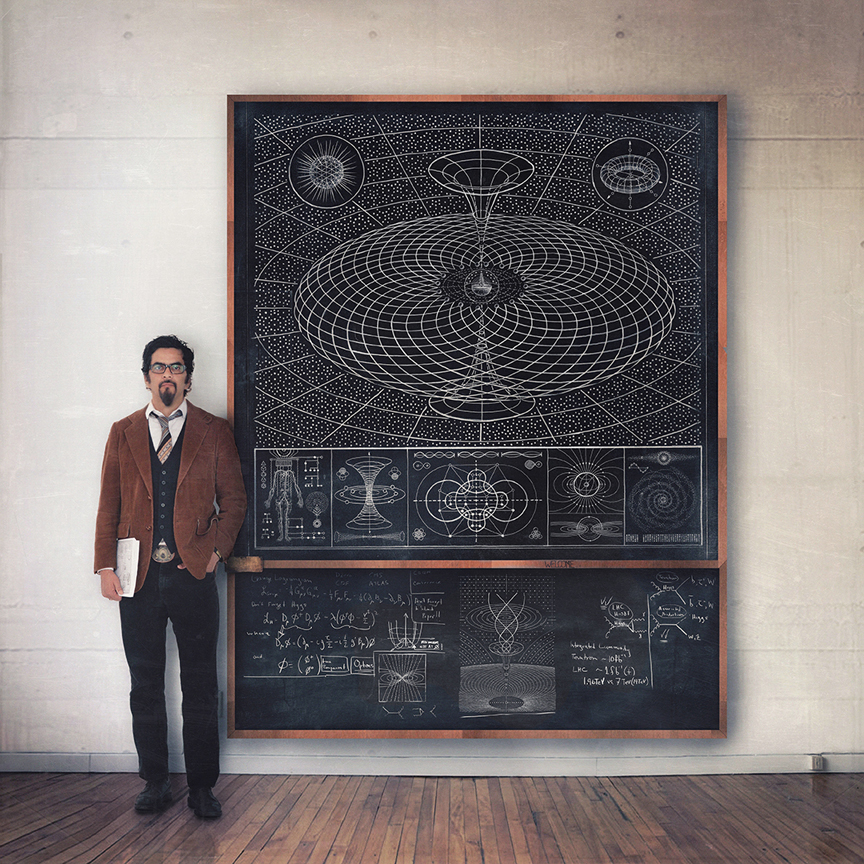
- Cosmological Mysteries by Daniel Martin Diaz
- Born: Tucson, Arizona, U.S.
- Known for: Painter, Composer
- Movement: Apocalyptic, Visionary, Outsider, Pop Surrealism
- Website: danielmartindiaz.com

Daniel Martin Diaz is an American artist and musician based in Tucson, Arizona.

The band P.O.D. commissioned Diaz to design and paint the cover of their self-titled album Payable on Death. The album went gold in four weeks and caused a controversy across the country due to the cover artwork Diaz created. In 2010, he designed and painted the cover of Good Charlotte's album, Cardiology.

== Influences ==
Diaz's influences include an eclectic mix from fantastical Mexican Retablos, mystical votive offerings, the Early Netherlandish painters, Gothic ornamentation, arcane religious sigils and medallions, alchemy, as well as symbolism culled from assorted secret societies such as The Rosicrucians.

== Music ==
Diaz is a primary member of the bands Blind Divine (with singer Paula Catherine Valencia); Crystal Radio (with singer Amelia Poe), Trees Speak and Magick Knives.

== Published works ==
- Triginta Uno Dies: Thirty-One Drawings, Thirty-One Days. Los Angeles, California: La Luz de Jesus Press, 2004
- Mysterium Fidei. Los Angeles, California: La Luz de Jesus Press, 2007
- Anatomy of Sorrow. Los Angeles, California: La Luz de Jesus Press, 2011
- Soul of Science. Tucson, Arizona: Mysticus Publishing, 2013
- Soul Machine. Los Angeles, California: La Luz de Jesus Press, 2018
