= Cardiology (album) =

Studio album by Good Charlotte
- Released: October 27, 2010
- Recorded: January – April 2010
- Studios: Studio Can Am (Tarzana, Los Angeles, California); The Armoury & The Warehouse Studio (Vancouver, Canada)
- Genre: Pop-punk
- Length: 46:52
- Label: Capitol
- Producer: Don Gilmore

Good Charlotte chronology
Good Morning Revival (2007)	Cardiology (2010)	Youth Authority (2016)

Singles from Cardiology
- 1. "Like It's Her Birthday" Released: August 20, 2010; 2. "Sex on the Radio" Released: January 31, 2011; 3. "Last Night" Released: February 22, 2011; 4. "1979" Released: August 1, 2011

Cardiology is the fifth album by the American rock band Good Charlotte. Within a year of releasing Good Morning Revival, Benji and Joel Madden had begun working on new material in early 2008. Pre-production started in early 2009 and tracking commenced in August with producer Howard Benson. Problems arose during this period; Benji Madden hesitated to work with Benson. Having completed the majority of the recording, Madden felt uncomfortable and realized the band was working with the wrong person after Benson removed two crucial verses from a track. After hearing rough mixes, Madden preferred the demo versions. Discussing this with producer Don Gilmore, he suggested the band start over in Vancouver, Canada. Following a meeting with the rest of the band, they relocated to Vancouver at the start of 2010. Recording sessions took place at the Armoury and Warehouse Studios before moving to Studio Can Am in Tarzana, California. Recording concluding in April 2010.

Following recording, the group spent two months stint on the Bamboozle Road Show 2010 tour. After announcing it had signed to Capitol Records in July, the band toured Europe supporting Pink. "Like It's Her Birthday" was released as a single in August and was followed by a lyric video and a music video in September. Cardiology was released in November; a Like It's Her Birthday remix EP was released shortly afterwards. The track "Sex on the Radio" was released as a single in early 2011, after which the band headlined the Kerrang! Tour in the UK in February. At the tour's conclusion, "Last Night" was released as a single. A North-American headlining tour began in March and was promoted with a music video for "Last Night". It was followed-up in June with a co-headlining U.S. tour with Yellowcard. A music video for "1979" was released at the end of July and the song was released as a single at the start of August.

Cardiology returns to the pop-punk sound of Good Charlotte's earlier releases while retaining some of its predecessor Good Morning Revival's electronic aspects. Most of the music was written by the Madden brothers while most of the lyrics were written by Benji Madden. Cardiology received a generally mixed reception from critics, garnering comments about the group's return-to-roots approach. It debuted at number 31 on the Billboard 200 and charted within the top 30 on five additional Billboard charts. As of September 2011, album sales stood at 52,000 copies. The album was successful in Australia, peaking at number three and later being certified gold. "Like It's Her Birthday", "Sex on the Radio" and "Last Night" all charted within the top 40, and were certified platinum in Australia. It charted within the top 30 in New Zealand, Switzerland and Austria, and had minor success in Canada, Germany, the UK and France."Like It's Her Birthday" also had minor success in the US, charting on the Bubbling Under Hot 100, Mainstream Top 40 and Dance Club Songs charts.

== Background ==
In March 2007, Good Charlotte released Good Morning Revival, which featured electronics and programming. In August that year, it was revealed Benji and Joel Madden were working on new material and were in discussion about their musical direction. Benji Madden said; "Some of us want to take things a little more rock. Joel wants to take things a little more dance." In March 2008, Joel Madden revealed he and Benji had started the writing process for a new album. Joel Madden said that him becoming a father two months prior would likely impact what he would write about. In November, Madden said the next album would "fill the void" left by Blink-182 after they split in 2005. He also said Good Charlotte were working on the album in a studio, with a planned release in mid-2009. Later that month, Greatest Remixes was released as a stop-gap. In March 2009, the group started pre-production on the new album, which Madden said was sounding "like a straight forward rock record. So far no real programming".

The following month, the Madden brothers stated they had written 40 songs. The group recorded the album between August and October that year with producer Howard Benson, who they chose to work with after recommendation from their management and their label Epic Records. Benji Madden was hesitant because he did not like the albums Benson had worked on previously but accepted the recommendation. Partway through the sessions, when recording was 70% done, Madden became uncomfortable but continued to commit to the recording. During one session, Benson removed the first two verses of "1979" that Madden said included the most important lyrics on the album. Madden asked Benson if he heard the lyrics, "and he's like 'No,' and I was like, 'We're with the wrong guy' ". After recording was finished, the Madden brothers visited Australia. Upon their return, they listened to a few rough mixes, which Benji Madden said sounded like all of the albums Benson had produced in the past and that he preferred the demo versions. Around this time, the band left Epic Records.

== Recording ==
Madden contacted producer Don Gilmore and told him of the situation. Gilmore, who was in Europe at the time, suggested Madden take a break, and when he got home to listen to the recordings. When Gilmore heard the demos, he stated they were the band's best material to that point. Gilmore proposed going to Vancouver, Canada, and starting the recording process anew. Madden told the group's manager to postpone all engagements and held an emergency band meeting. The other members agreed about starting over and the band moved to Vancouver with Gilmore in January 2010. In a post on their website, Madden stated the band "needed to be in the studio with someone who understood the heart of [the] band. And what that is, it's YOU GUYS".

The group took a handful of songs with them to Vancouver and wrote new ones. Sessions took place at The Armoury and The Warehouse Studio in Vancouver, and later at Studio Can Am in Tarzana, California. Recording was handled by Mark Kiczula with assistance from Mike Cashin and Josh Bowman. Sessions concluded in April. Gilmore mixed all of the tracks except "Last Night" and "Harlow's Song (Can't Dream Without You)", which were done by Serban Ghenea at MixStar Studios in Virginia Beach, Virginia. John Hanes served as mixing engineer and was assisted by Tim Roberts. Ghenea also did additional mixing on "Like It's Her Birthday". Bart Hendrickson and BC Smith played keyboards and did programming. Ted Jensen mastered the recordings at Sterling Sound Studios in New York City.

== Composition ==
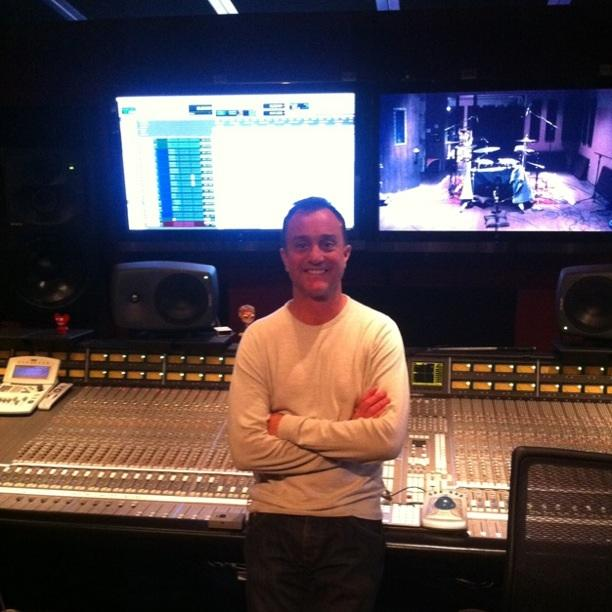
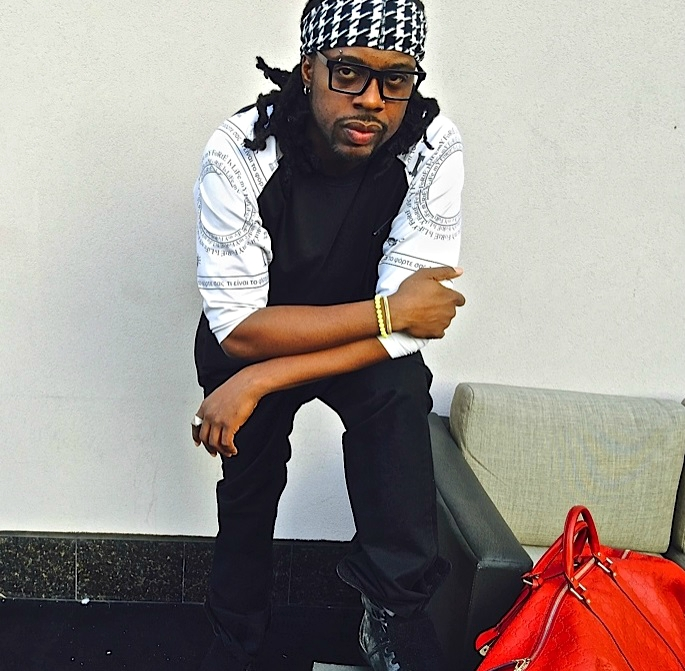
Some of the lyrics and music was co-written with John Feldmann (left) and Detail (right).

=== Overview ===
The album's title, according to Joel Madden, is about the rough concept of "a studying of the heart". Joel Madden told MTV news; "There's nothing dance-y on the record, though, at all, which is different from our last one". Mostly removed from the dance-punk sound of Good Morning Revival, Cardiology is a return to the pop-punk sound of their earlier work and has also been called pop rock. The brothers mostly compared it to their 2002 album The Young and the Hopeless, which features big hooks and a lot of harmonies.

Electronic elements can be heard on the album; a reoccurring synthesizer in "Let the Music Play", the intro to "Last Night", the entirety of "Interlude: The Fifth Chamber", and a synthesizer throughout "Cardiology". The majority of the music is credited to Benji Madden and co-writers John Feldmann, Gilmore, Joel Madden, Matt Squire and Detail. The Madden brothers wrote most of the lyrics with occasional contributions from Gilmore, Feldmann and Detail. Additional writing was done by Gilmore, Sam Hollander, Dave Katz and Luke Walker.

=== Songs ===
"Introduction to Cardiology" is an a cappella track in the vein of the Beach Boys and consists solely of a line from the title-track. Benji Madden said "Let the Music Play" is similar to "Hold On" from The Young and the Hopeless, which was inspired by comments on a blog post on the group's website in which they said they would re-record the album. "Counting the Days" is a "love letter" to their fans, according to Madden. Madden said "Silver Screen Romance" is "totally the Good Charlotte return to pop-punk"; it features a distorted vocal track in the middle section. The song is about each of the band members' love for something or someone. The dance-rock track "Like It's Her Birthday" is a mix of the group's self-titled and Good Morning Revival albums.

Madden said "Last Night" is "almost like the sequel" to "Dance Floor Anthem". "Sex on the Radio" in an attempt to emulate the spirit of the hearing of a woman's voice on a radio. The track reminds Madden of the music of the Cars and Cheap Trick, and is about "all the girls out there who make boys want to start bands and go on tour". "Alive" is the "most straightforward rock" on the album, according to Madden. The Madden brothers wrote "Standing Ovation" about Joel's children and their niece. Benji Madden learned how to play guitar by listening to Oasis; the track is "straight out of the Noel Gallagher handbook".

The piano-led track "Harlow's Song (Can't Dream Without You)" was written solely for Joel Madden's daughter Harlow but was included on the album after Benji Madden became emotional after hearing it. Madden made "Interlude: The Fifth Chamber" to give the listener "a musical breather". "1979" is about the happy memories of the Madden brothers' family, mainly their parents. "There She Goes" is about how the realization "things change, but we're still the same boys no matter how far we go from home". Discussing "Right Where I Belong", Madden said; "No matter what happens or what I experience, God and music are always waiting for me with open arms. This song says just that".

== Release ==
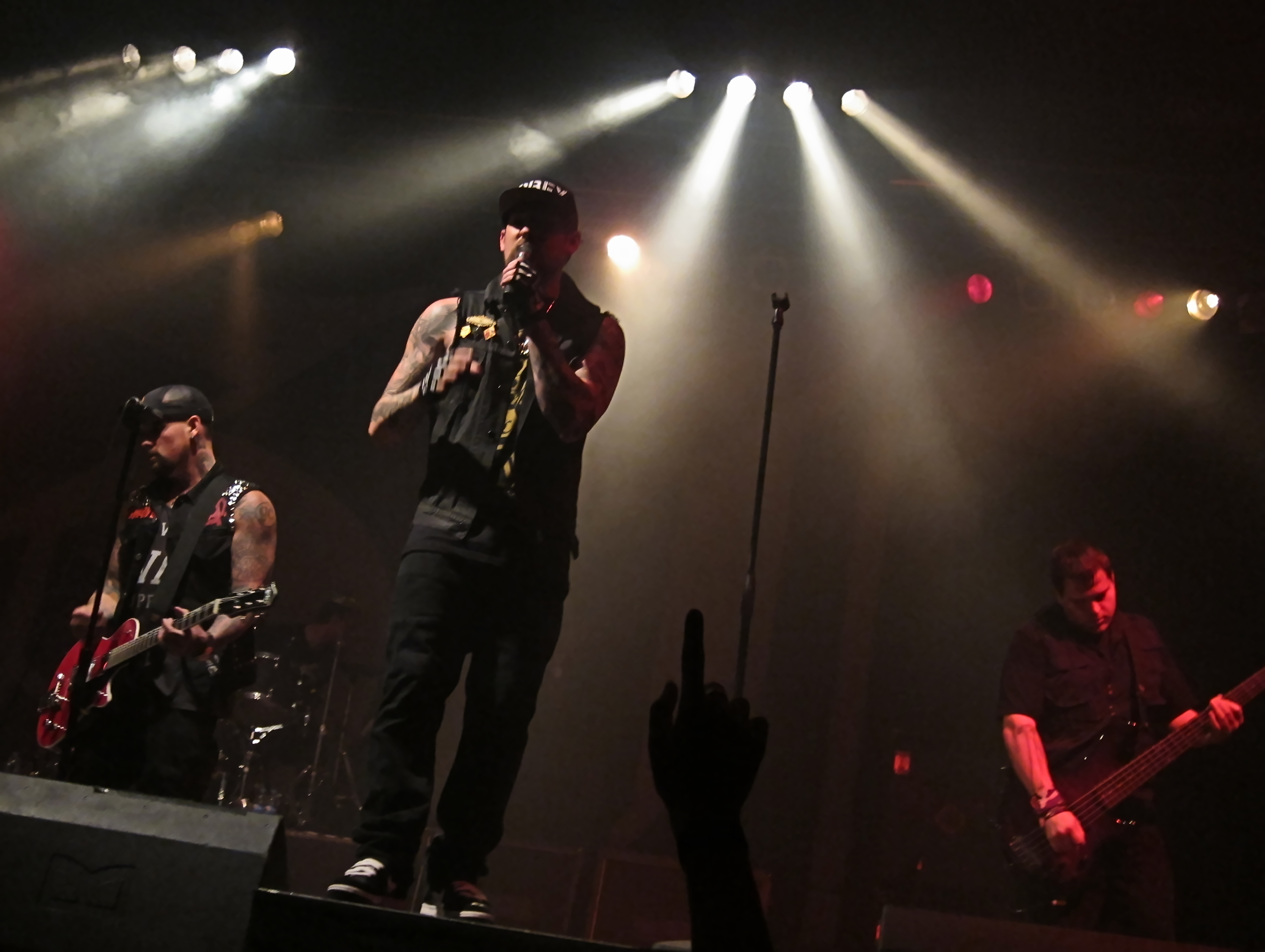
Good Charlotte on tour in Germany, 2011

In May and June, Good Charlotte went on the Bamboozle Road Show 2010 tour. On July 22 that year, the group announced it had signed to Capitol Records and would release Cardiology in October. Following this, Good Charlotte performed at Sonisphere Festival and supported Pink on her European tour. The band posted "Like It's Her Birthday" online on August 5 and the same day announced on its website another song from the album would be posted if the YouTube video of "Like It's Her Birthday" received more than 100,000 views. The target was reached on August 15 and the band released a video for "Counting the Days". "Like It's Her Birthday" was released as a single on August 20.

On September 16, 2010, the album's artwork, which was created by Daniel Martin Diaz, was revealed. Benji Madden, who was a fan of Diaz's work, invited him to create the artwork for Cardiology. Diaz accepted the offer after hearing the band's material. A lyric video was released for "Like It's Her Birthday" on September 27, which was followed by the song's music video a day later. The video was directed by Josh Forbes and depicts the band on a night out.

Cardiology was made available for streaming on October 26, 2010, on the group's Myspace profile, before being released on November 2 in the U.S. through Capitol Records. It was released in Japan on October 27 and in the UK on November 1. A Like It's Her Birthday remix EP was released on November 12. "Sex on the Radio" was released as a single on January 31, 2011. The group headlined the Kerrang! Tour in the UK in February. "Last Night" was released as a radio single to top-40 stations in the U.S. on February 22. In March that year, Good Charlotte toured North America with This Century and Forever the Sickest Kids. A music video was released for "Last Night" on March 20; it was made in collaboration with Funny or Die and features a recreated set of the U.S. television game show Family Double Dare. The band incorporated footage of the show's former host Marc Summers into the clip and manipulated it to show him miming the song's lyrics. In June 2011, the band went on a co-headlining tour of the U.S. with Yellowcard; they were supported by Runner Runner. A music video for "1979" premiered on AOL Music on July 25, and on August 1 the track was released as a single.

== Reception ==
Professional ratings
Aggregate scores
Source	Rating
AnyDecentMusic?	3.5/10
Metacritic	50/100
Review scores
Source	Rating
AllMusic	3/5 stars
The A.V. Club	D
Clash	1/10
Entertainment Weekly	C
NME	1/10
Rock Sound	8/10
Rolling Stone	2.5/5 stars
Spin	4/10
Us Weekly	2.5/5 stars

=== Critical response ===
Cardiology received generally mixed reviews according to review aggregator Metacritic, and AnyDecentMusic? provided an average of 3.5/10. AllMusic reviewer Stephen Thomas Erlewine said; "Maturity doesn’t necessarily suit the band ... but every step Good Charlotte makes toward a comfortable middle age on Cardiology is a step that succeeds, producing music that resonates louder and longer than the flashy twaddle of Good Morning Revival". Evan Lucy of Alternative Press praised the album for its return-to-roots musical style and wrote, "Good Charlotte might be multi-platinum superstars, but Cardiology might be their best effort yet". The A.V. Club writer Jason Heller pondered whether a back-to-basics approach was worth anything, before answering himself: "As it turns out, zip." TC of Clash cautioned readers to avoid the album, stating it was "meandering chirpy slobber that sounds more boy band than ever".

BBC Music Fraser McAlpine complimented the "sumptuous production touches" but said listeners do not hear a Good Charlotte record "expecting sonic revelation" and wrote the listener receives "a bunch of energetic, melodic, fun songs on the themes of love, girls and, well, more fun". In a review for Entertainment Weekly, Andy Greenwald found the album "struggles to stay relevant ... though [Joel Madden's] heart hasn't failed him, unfortunately his ear for hooks has". NME's Matt Wilkinson accused the band of unoriginality in their song titles and concluded the album is "monstrously offensive" and "the latest shit-streak from music's laziest sons".

Amy Bangs of Rock Sound praised the group's decision to abandon "their early material's urban (ish) influences, while maintaining the fun parts of pop-punk", leaving listeners with "the Good Charlotte that brought us the brilliantly catchy 'Seasons' or 'Festival Song', without the awkward rapping interludes. And for that we thank them." Rolling Stone writer Jon Dolan said the album is "rife with signs of rock ambition" but the eventual "results are still kid-friendly and mostly forgettable". Spin reviewer Mikael Wood wrote that the album "dials down the sparkle [of Good Morning Revival], which is kind of a bummer". Us Weekly's Ian Drew called it "their most diverse foray into pop-rock so far", with "both downright danceable fun" and "light nostalgia". Nicholas Coren of Virgin Music said the band "restore the sound that their fans grew to love when they started, resulting with a fusion of tracks that sound like they're from the era" of their first two albums.

=== Commercial performance and legacy ===
Cardiology debuted at number 31 on the Billboard 200 and appeared on five additional Billboard charts; it peaked at number six on the Alternative Albums chart, number seven on the Top Rock Albums chart, number 13 on the Digital Albums chart, number 24 on the Internet Albums chart, and number 28 on the Top Current Albums chart. As of September 2011, the album has sold over 52,000 copies in the U.S. and charted at number three in Australia, number 18 in New Zealand, number 24 in Switzerland, number 29 in Austria, number 46 in Germany, number 63 in the UK, and number 67 in France. It was later certified gold in Australia.

"Like It's Her Birthday" charted in the U.S. at number 13 on the Rock Digital Song Sales chart, number 14 on the Bubbling Under Hot 100 chart, number 33 on the Mainstream Top 40 chart, and number 36 on the Dance Club Songs chart. "Counting the Days" charted at number 26 on the Rock Digital Song Sales chart.

In Australia, "Like It's Her Birthday" charted at number seven, "Sex on the Radio" charted at number 26, and "Last Night" charted at number 27. All three songs were certified platinum in Australia.

In 2016, Benji Madden said of Cardiology; "It was really important, more emotionally than anything else at that time. That record was more for me and the band than it was for anybody else."

== Track listing ==
Writing credits per booklet.

No.	Title	Lyrics	Music	Length
1.	"Introduction to Cardiology"	Benji Madden	B. Madden	0:47
2.	"Let the Music Play"	B. Madden; Joel Madden	B. Madden	4:12
3.	"Counting the Days"	B. Madden; J. Madden	B. Madden; John Feldmann	2:51
4.	"Silver Screen Romance"	B. Madden; J. Madden	B. Madden	3:10
5.	"Like It's Her Birthday"	B. Madden; J. Madden; Gilmore	B. Madden	3:30
6.	"Last Night"	B. Madden; J. Madden; Gilmore	B. Madden; Gilmore	3:40
7.	"Sex on the Radio"	B. Madden; J. Madden	B. Madden	3:16
8.	"Alive"	B. Madden; J. Madden; Gilmore	B. Madden	3:14
9.	"Standing Ovation"	B. Madden; J. Madden; Feldmann	B. Madden; Feldmann	3:39
10.	"Harlow's Song (Can't Dream Without You)"	J. Madden	J. Madden	3:34
11.	"Interlude: The Fifth Chamber"		B. Madden; J. Madden; Gilmore	1:29
12.	"1979"	B. Madden; J. Madden	B. Madden; Matt Squire	2:59
13.	"There She Goes"	B. Madden; J. Madden; Detail	B. Madden; Detail	3:22
14.	"Right Where I Belong"	B. Madden; J. Madden	B. Madden; Squire	3:52
15.	"Cardiology"	B. Madden	B. Madden	2:56
Total length:				46:52

Japanese edition bonus tracks
No.	Title	Lyrics	Music	Length
16.	"Like It's Her Birthday" (remix feat. Miyavi)	B. Madden; J. Madden; Gilmore	B. Madden	3:33
17.	"Accident Prone"	B. Madden	B. Madden	3:11

iTunes bonus tracks
No.	Title	Lyrics	Music	Length
16.	"Crash"	B. Madden	B. Madden	3:08
17.	"Catherine (Damn This Situation)"	B. Madden	B. Madden	3:13

Best Buy bonus tracks
No.	Title	Lyrics	Music	Length
16.	"Catherine (Damn This Situation)"	B. Madden	B. Madden	3:13
17.	"Accident Prone"	B. Madden	B. Madden	3:11
18.	"Silver Screen Romance" (acoustic version)	B. Madden; J. Madden	B. Madden	2:51
19.	"Better Run" (Army of Me cover)	Vincent Paul Scheuerman	Vincent Paul Scheuerman	3:40
20.	"Between the Bars" (Elliott Smith cover)	Elliott Smith	Elliott Smith	2:23

== Personnel ==
Personnel per booklet.

Good Charlotte

- Joel Madden – vocals
- Benji Madden – guitars, vocals
- Billy Martin – guitars, keyboards
- Paul Thomas – bass
- Dean Butterworth – drums

Additional musicians

- Bart Hendrickson – keyboards, programming
- BC Smith – keyboards, programming

Production

- Don Gilmore – producer, mixing
- Mark Kiczula – recording
- Mike Cashin – assistant
- Josh Bowman – assistant
- Serban Ghenea – additional mixing (track 5); mixing (tracks 6 and 10)
- John Hanes – mix engineer (tracks 5, 6 and 10)
- Tim Roberts – assistant (tracks 5, 6 and 10)
- Ted Jensen – mastering (tracks 1–15)
- Evren Göknar – mastering (tracks 16–20)
- Myriam Santos – photography
- Daniel Martin Diaz – illustration
- Angelica Cob-Baehler – creative direction
- Gordon H. Jee – creative direction
- SMOG Design, Inc. – art direction, design

== Charts and certifications ==
=== Weekly charts ===
Chart (2010)	Peak position
Australian Albums (ARIA)	3
Austrian Albums (Ö3 Austria)	29
French Albums (SNEP)	67
German Albums (Offizielle Top 100)	46
New Zealand Albums (RMNZ)	18
Swiss Albums (Schweizer Hitparade)	24
UK Albums (Official Charts)	63
US Billboard 200	31
US Top Alternative Albums (Billboard)	6
US Top Rock Albums (Billboard)	7

=== Certifications ===
Region	Certification	Certified units/sales
Australia (ARIA)	Gold	35,000^{^}
^{^} Shipments figures based on certification alone.
