= Last Night (Good Charlotte song) =

Single by Good Charlotte

from the album Cardiology
- Released: February 22, 2011 (U.S. radio); April 7, 2012 (Europe)
- Genre: Pop-punk; dance-punk
- Length: 3:40
- Label: Capitol
- Songwriters: B. Madden; J. Madden; Gilmore

Good Charlotte singles chronology
| "Sex on the Radio" (2010) | "Last Night" (2011) | "1979" (2011) |

"Last Night" is a song by American pop-punk band Good Charlotte, from their fifth studio album Cardiology. It was released as the third single under Capitol Records on February 22, 2011. The song is a pop-punk and alternative rock track and was written by the band and talks about having a not-so-memorable evening but enjoying it. It received mixed reviews from music critics; some thought it was a "weak and forced song", while others felt it was a "party anthem". The video is a reconstructed version of the early 1990s Nickelodeon game show Family Double Dare featuring its former host Marc Summers.

== Background ==
According to a Benji Madden interview with Alternative Press this is "almost like the sequel to 'I Don't Want to Be in Love.'" Madden added: "This song is another one of those tracks that’s just for fun." "All the vocals in the chorus will be really fun when we play it live." In the song, Joel Madden sings of meeting a tantalizing girl and then waking up with a foggy recollection of what happened next. Whether he had too much to drink or had something slipped into his drink is unclear, but the singer still says it might have been the time of his life. In the chorus, he sings: "Last night, can't remember / What happened? Where'd we go? / I woke up this morning / Where's my car? Where's my keys? Where's my clothes? / I feel my head still spinning but I'm doing alright / Cause I think I just had the best night of my life."

== Critical reception ==
Sputnikmusic's reviewer said that: "Last Night” begins with some fuzzy “bleeps and bloops” that have no impact on the song and proceed to continue intermittently throughout the background of the track's remaining three minutes." A negative review came from Kevin Barber editor of Consequence of Sound who said, negatively, that: "“Last Night” vary in musical style, but the band ultimately miss the mark and are rather forgettable. Barber also thought that the song "seem forced, as if the band was not trying to push any sort of envelope and wanted to make sure that the formula they had used in the past, rather successfully, was not broken." Nicholas Coren from Virgin Music said, positively, that: "‘Last Night’ is a party anthem, which will capture the attention of the audience."

== Music video ==
The video is a reconstructed version of the early 1990s Nickelodeon game show Family Double Dare. "This video takes place in the 1990s and we were all 1990s kids, so we know it pretty well," said guitarist Benji Madden in a statement. "This was one of our favorite shows growing up. I always wanted to go on Family Double Dare, and now my dreams get to come true." It features a lovingly reconstructed version of the classic game show's set and finds the bandmembers participating in a number of the program's extra sloppy challenges — including a handful of entries on the famous game-ending obstacle course. Also appearing in the clip, in a starring role, is former "Family Double Dare" host Marc Summers, who oversees the proceedings and even lip-synchs some of the song. The video also features a number of very specific winks and nods to the original show, including the "Pie Cam" and a shout-out to Space Camp (which was often involved in the grand prize).

== Promotion ==
The band performed the song live on Live with Regis and Kelly on February 21, 2011. The song, along with Kesha's song "Blow", were used by Channel 7 in Australia for the promotion of Downton Abbey. The song was also used in the trailer for American Reunion.

== Charts ==
| Chart (2011) | Peak position |
|---|---|
| Australia (ARIA) | 27 |

== Certifications ==
| Region | Certification | Certified units/sales |
|---|---|---|
| Australia (ARIA) | Platinum | 70,000^{^} |
^{^} Shipments figures based on certification alone.

== Release history ==
Release dates and formats for "Last Night"
| Region | Date | Format | Label(s) | Ref. |
|---|---|---|---|---|
| United States | February 22, 2011 | Mainstream airplay | Capitol | |
