= Like It's Her Birthday =

Single by Good Charlotte

from the album Cardiology
- Released: August 24, 2010
- Recorded: April 2010
- Genre: Dance-punk; pop-punk
- Length: 3:29
- Label: Capitol
- Songwriters: Benji Madden; Joel Madden; Don Gilmore
- Producer: Don Gilmore

Good Charlotte singles chronology
"Where Would We Be Now" (2008)	"Like It's Her Birthday" (2010)	"Sex on the Radio" (2010)

Music video
- "Like It's Her Birthday" on YouTube

"Like It's Her Birthday" is a song by American pop-punk band Good Charlotte from their fifth studio album, Cardiology (2010). It was released as the album's first single on August 24, 2010.

Written by the band brothers Benji and Joel Madden, with additional writing and full production of Don Gilmore, the song is a pop-punk song that talks about having fun with a girlfriend who likes to celebrate every day like it was her birthday.

The song received positive reviews from music critics, who praised it for its catchiness, funny lyrics and danceable content. It was a big success on the ARIA Charts, reaching the top ten.

The band premiered the song live for the first time on May 22 at the 2010 Bamboozle Road Show in Charlotte, North Carolina.

A version featuring Tonight Alive was also released, though they do not appear in the video version.

The music video was released on September 21, 2010, on YouTube. It alternates between shots of the band performing in a dark room and scenes in a club.

== Background ==
Guitarist Benji Madden wrote on the band's website that Good Charlotte released the song to show appreciation of their patient fan base: "We always put a song on every record that's there just for fun and this is that song." He also explained to Alternative Press that it "has a good mix of the old-school sound from our self-titled record from 2000, and the sound we explored on Good Morning Revival in 2007.: Guitarist Billy Martin discussed his contribution to the song during an interview with Unrescuable Schizo: "I got to do a guitar solo in it. I've been pushing to do some guitar solos for years. I got to do a really cool one on that song so that was definitely a highlight for me. It's a fairly pop song for us. It's still rock, it's very guitar-heavy but it's sort of a real pop melody. By putting a big rock guitar solo in the middle of the song, it gives it a nice edge. I like that fine line between being a rock band and writing pop songs."

== Critical reception ==
Kevin Barber from Consequence of Sound wrote, "“Like It’s Her Birthday” is a little off-color from what the album is trying to accomplish. It does not shy away from the dance-y, mall-pop type of music that they were trying to avoid, but it is a catchy single that lets the public know that Good Charlotte is back," adding, "It will be a guilty pleasure that some will try to ignore, but most will succumb to." Ian Drew from US Magazine considerate it a "downright danceable fun". Jon Dolan from Rolling Stone said: "Like It's Her Birthday" sets a man's problem ("She said she only had a meeting/But she is dressed for something/Something that is no good") to a bubblegum groove that a 14-year-old could throw a fist to." Eric Sundermann from Spin gave it a positive review, saying: "The track blends a combination of old and new Good Charlotte: It's a fast paced party song, but rather than "The Anthem"-style distorted electric guitars, the group uses synthesizers to create the upbeat sound."

== Music video ==
The music video was released on August 27, 2010 on YouTube. It features the band performing inside of a glass cube-like structure in a blacked-out room. The video also shows the band at a party with a number of attractive women. Cameo appearances are made by The Maine's John O'Callaghan and Kennedy Brock, Boys Like Girls' Martin Johnson and Paul DiGiovanni, and Mest's Tony Lovato.

== Chart performance ==
"Like It's Her Birthday" debuted on the ARIA Digital Track Chart at #40 on August 30, 2010 and #17 on the ARIA Top 50 Singles Chart on September 5, 2010.

== Charts ==
=== Weekly charts ===
Chart (2010)	Peak position
Australia (ARIA)	7
New Zealand (RMNZ)	34
UK Rock & Metal (OCC)	8
US Bubbling Under Hot 100 (Billboard)	14
US Mainstream Top 40 (Billboard)	33

=== Year-end charts ===
Chart (2010)	Position
Australia (ARIA)	82

== Certifications ==
Region	Certification	Certified units/sales
Australia (ARIA)	Platinum	70,000^{^}
^{^} Shipments figures based on certification alone.
