= Lola Ray =

American musical group

- Origin: Brooklyn, NY
- Genres: Indie rock
- Years active: 2001 – present
- Labels: DC Flag / Others
- Members: John Balicanta; Brian Spina; Frederick Beck; Chris Upton
- Past members: James McIvor; Alex Smolinski

Lola Ray is an indie rock band from Brooklyn, New York. It was formed when singer/guitarist John Balicanta re-assembled his high school band from Anaheim, California in order to record a demo for Peter Robinson of RCA Records.

== First band ==
Balicanta and high school friends Brian Spina and James McIvor had started a band called Lola Corin (Tagalog for "Grandma Corin") during their high school years in Southern California . They had been friends since the seventh grade, but when John left to attend college in New York City, the band dissolved.

== Reformation ==
Balicanta secured an internship at Dumbo Studios after meeting RCA's Peter Robinson. Impressed with his solo songwriting, Robinson agreed to sponsor a demo if Balicanta could assemble a band. After finding Alex Smolinski in New York, John called on Spina and McIvor who moved to Brooklyn immediately . They called their band Lola Ray.

== First release ==
Lola Ray was signed to Good Charlotte's record label DC Flag and opened for the band on a nationwide tour. Their music video for their first single, "Automatic Girl" found airplay on the Fuse and MTV2 rotations. It was also used on the EA Sports' NHL 2005 video game..

In 2006 Lola Ray released their second album, Liars, through Red Int/Red Ink. Smolinski and McIvor have since left the band and have been replaced as the band continues to tour. Post-Lola Ray, James McIvor pursued a PhD in mathematics at UC Berkeley.

== Discography ==
=== Albums ===
- I Don't Know You - 2004
- Liars - 2006
