= Sex on the Radio =

Single by Good Charlotte

from the album Cardiology
- Released: December 2010 (Oceania only)
- Genre: Pop-punk; pop rock
- Length: 3:16
- Label: Capitol
- Songwriter(s): Benji Madden; Joel Madden; Sam Hollander; Dave Katz
- Producer(s): S. Hollander; D. Katz

Good Charlotte singles chronology
"Like It's Her Birthday" (2010)	"Sex on the Radio" (2010)	"Last Night" (2011)

"Sex on the Radio" is a song by American pop-punk band Good Charlotte, taken from their fifth studio album Cardiology. It was released as the second single in December 2010, only in Australia and New Zealand. It was written by the band brothers Benji and Joel Madden, with additional writing from Sam Hollander and Dave Katz, with production by the two latter. The song is a pop-punk track and talks about all the girls out there who make boys want to start bands and go on tour. It charted inside the top-thirty on the ARIA Singles Chart. The song received mixed reviews from music critics, some thought it was a lively and funny track, others thought it "cheesy" and that it shouldn't be on the album. A music video was made for the track, in which the band walks the street and ask people what they think of the song.

== Background ==
Guitarist Benji Madden explained to Alternative Press that this tribute to hearing a female rock vocalist's voice on the radio is "about all the girls out there who make boys want to start bands and go on tour." According to Benji, this song reminds him of late 1970s and early 1980s bands The Cars and Cheap Trick."

== Critical reception ==
Fraser McAlpine from BBC Music said, positively, that the song is "about listening to pop music and getting a bit too excited." Sputnikmusic's reviewer said: "There is a noticeable influx of speedy pop-punk tempos in the song “Sex on the Radio”, which provide a lively edge that was rarely seen on Good Morning Revival." A negative review came from Kevin Barber editor of Consequence of Sound who said: "Sex On The Radio should have been passed over and not included." Barber also thought that the song has "a really cheesy chorus, and it just seems that the band did not put a whole lot of effort into this song."

== Music video ==
The music video premiered on January 29, 2011, and shows the band walking the street and asking people what they think of the song.

== Charts ==
Chart (2010)	Peak position
Australia (ARIA)	26

== Certifications ==
Region	Certification	Certified units/sales
Australia (ARIA)	Platinum	70,000^{^}
^{^} Shipments figures based on certification alone.
