= Carol Beach York =

American writer

Carol Beach York (January 21, 1928 – April 26, 2013) was an American author of juvenile novels. Hailing from Chicago, Illinois, she is best known for novels in the mystery/suspense genre, and for the Butterfield Square Series, which includes Good Charlotte, from which the pop rock band Good Charlotte took its name.

== Selected works ==
- Sparrow Lake, Coward-McCann (1962) No ISBN available; Lib of Cong # 62-8620
- One Summer, Coward-McCann (1963) No ISBN available; Lib of Cong #63-10168
- Miss Know-It-All, F. Watts (1966) No ISBN available
- The Christmas Dolls, illustrated by Victoria de Larrea, F. Watts (1967) No ISBN available
- The Christmas Dolls, (paperback) Scholastic Inc. (1967) ISBN 0-590-42435-1 - "Doll-sized fantasy that works well enough for very little, very girly girls--not too silly, not too sweet."
- The Good Day Mice, illustrated by Victoria de Larrea, F. Watts (1968) No ISBN available; Lib of Cong # 68-16600 - "Minor mice ellany despite some langy drawings."
- The Blue Umbrella, Franklin Watts (1968) No ISBN available; Lib of Cong # 68-10107
- The Christmas Dolls, Chatto & Windus (Britain) (1969) ISBN 0-7011-0295-0
- Good Charlotte, illustrated by Victoria de Larrea, F. Watts (1969) No ISBN available; Lib of Cong 71-79850
- Nothing Ever Happens Here, Hawthorn Books (1970) No ISBN available; Lib of Cong # 75-106180
- Miss Know-It-All Returns, illustrated by Victoria de Larrea, F. Watts (1972) ISBN 0-531-02558-6
- Mystery at Dark Wood, Watts (1972) No ISBN available
- The Secret of the Tree House, formerly published as The Tree House Mystery, Weekly Reader Books (1973) No ISBN available
- Takers and Returners, Thomas Nelson, Inc. (1973) ISBN 0-8407-6292-5 - "Slight on characterization and atmosphere, Takers and Returners nevertheless accurately and suspensefully demonstrates the dynamics of a dare."
- I Will Make You Disappear, T. Nelson (1974) ISBN 0-8407-6410-3
- Beware of This Shop, Thomas Nelson Publishers (1977) ISBN 978-0840765499
- Remember Me When I'm Dead, Elsevier/Nelson (1980) ISBN 0-525-66694-X
- The Look-Alike Girl, Beaufort Books (1980) ISBN 0-8253-0016-9
- Washington Irving's Rip Van Winkle, written by Washington Irving, illustrated by Kinuko Y. Craft, Troll Associates (1980) ISBN 0-8937-5299-1
- Stray Dog, Beaufort Books (1981) ISBN 0-8253-0046-0
- Candles in the Window, Dutton (1982)
- Miss Know-it-All and the Wishing Lamp, illustrated by Leslie Merrill, Bantam Books (1987) ISBN 0-553-15536-9
- Pudmuddles, illustrated by Lisa Thiesing, HarperCollins (1993) ISBN 0-06-020436-2
- The Key to the Playhouse, Scholastic Inc. (1994) ISBN 0-590-46258-X
