= Vita Chambers =

Canadian singer and songwriter (born 1993)

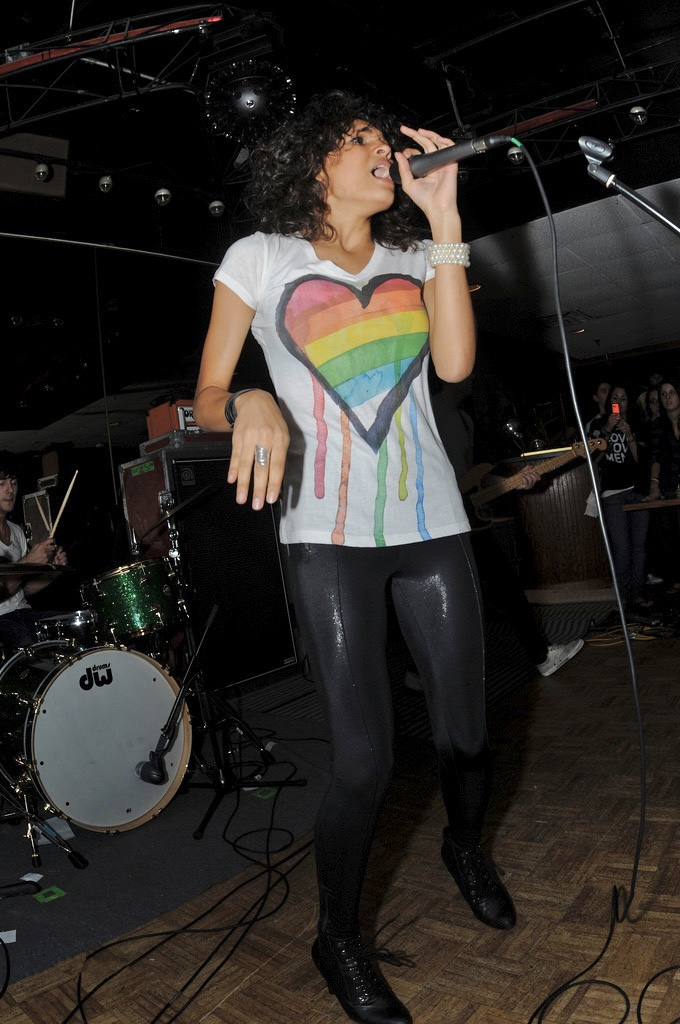
- Chambers in 2009

Background information
- Born: Vita Chambers; June 10, 1993 (age 33); Vancouver, British Columbia, Canada
- Genres: Pop rock, electropop, pop music
- Occupations: Singer, songwriter
- Years active: 2009–present
- Label: SRP / Universal Motown (2009-2013) Goldnote Productions Ltd (2013-present)
- Website: Official website

Vita Chambers (born June 10, 1993) is a Barbadian-Canadian singer and songwriter. She is best known for her hit single "Fix You" in 2012.

== Musical career and early life ==
Chambers was born in Vancouver, Canada. She then moved to Barbados, where she grew up. She began her career by posting four of her original songs on her MySpace page at the age of 15. She was signed by Sylvia Rhone to Universal Motown when she turned 16.

Chambers was the opening act, singing "Heat Wave", at the November 2009 Thanksgiving Day NFL half-time show featuring a Motown Review by the future of Motown. Chambers' first single, "Young Money", was released in March 2010. Her EP "The Get Go" was released in March with five songs on iTunes. At age 17, Vita toured with fellow Canadian singer Justin Bieber as one of his opening acts on his My World Tour in 2010, as well as performing at Lilith Fair in 2010, Bamboozle Road Show, Pop-Con at the Nassau Coliseum, and touring with Forever The Sickest Kids. She also performed with Estelle at the 2010 Soul Train Awards in Atlanta.

Chambers is now an independent artist under her own company Gold Note Productions. She released a single, "Fix You", on December 18, 2012. Fix You was nominated for the Best Dance Record for the 2013 Juno Awards, and within 3 months "Fix You" entered the Top 40 in Canada. Vita was also the #4 Emerging artist on the Canadian Hot 100 Billboard chart. It spent over 20 weeks in the top 100. "Fix You" achieved Gold status in Canada, and has sold over 350,000 copies worldwide to date.

Later that year, Vita released her second single called "What If?" under Gold Note Productions Ltd. In 2014 Vita received 2 nominations at the Canadian Music Radio Awards for Best New Group or Solo Artist CHR and Best New Group or Solo Artist Dance/Urban/Rhythmic.

Vita released a new single called "A+D" on April 21, 2014, which lyrically expressed Vita's strong belief that good is in everyone despite outside influences. She also released a 2014 FIFA World Cup song called "El Camino", produced by Mike Solo with a chorus of 8 kids.

In February 2015, Vita released a new single called "Kings Of Love" along with an accompanying music video directed by Jimmy Keegan. Since then Vita has released "His Love", "A+D Orchestral", "Tell Me", "Ferrous" and "Want You" in 2016.

In 2018 Vita released her new EP entitled VITA.

== Discography ==
EP

- VITA (2018)

=== Singles ===
Release date	Name	Peak positions (Canadian Hot 100)	Album
December 18, 2012	Fix You	40	Fix You – Single
October 15, 2013	What If?	—	What If? – Single
April 12, 2014	El Camino	—	El Camino – Single
April 21, 2014	A+D	—	A+D – Single
November 11, 2014	Tell Me	—	Tell Me – Single
February 10, 2015	Kings Of Love	—	Kings Of Love – Single – June 11, 2015 Ferrous Single: October 24, 2016 Want You Single

=== Albums ===
Release date	Name	Peak positions	Album
March 2, 2010	The Get Go	—	The Get Go – EP
