= Generation Rx =

Studio album by Good Charlotte
- Released: September 14, 2018
- Recorded: January – March 2018
- Studio: MDDN & NRG Recording Studios (Los Angeles, California)
- Genre: Pop-punk; alternative rock
- Length: 31:26
- Label: MDDN; BMG
- Producer: Benji Madden; Zakk Cervini

Good Charlotte chronology
Youth Authority (2016)	Generation Rx (2018)	Motel Du Cap (2025)

Singles from Generation Rx
- 1. "Actual Pain" Released: May 25, 2018; 2. "Shadowboxer" Released: July 13, 2018; 3. "Prayers" Released: August 28, 2018; 4. "Self Help" Released: October 25, 2018; 5. "Cold Song" Released: February 8, 2019

Generation Rx is the seventh album by the American rock band Good Charlotte. The album was released on September 14, 2018, through MDDN and BMG. This is the band's final album to feature drummer Dean Butterworth before his departure from the band in 2025.

== Background ==
Good Charlotte self-released their sixth album Youth Authority in July 2016, their first since they went on a hiatus in 2011. Vocalist Joel Madden felt that they had no momentum following their hiatus, and viewed Youth Authority as helping to rebuild it. Guitarist Benji Madden added that it served as a good restarting point for the band. They made the album as the members felt they had something to say after the years on hiatus. However, Joel Madden said it didn't completely embody what was going on in their headspace at the time. He went as far to add that two of the songs on it were there solely because they felt they had to include them.

At the start of 2018, the band were reflecting, having played at the memorial service for rapper Lil Peep earlier in December 2017. They covered Peep's "Awful Things" and later released it as a single. Benji Madden said, since the group would often follow their feelings and not focus on anything else, they became inspired to write a new record. The members discussed what they liked and disliked making Youth Authority, before taking into account what they felt their fans would want from them. After realizing their fans would want them to be honest, they decided to write material that was more organic and naturally felt good to them.

== Production ==
Benji Madden and Zakk Cervini produced the album, which was recorded at the headquarters of the brothers' company MDDN in Los Angeles, California between January and March 2018. Drums were recorded at NRG Studios. Cervini and Courtney Ballard served as engineers with assistance from Jon Lundin. Colin Schwanke did additional editing on "Self Help", "Leech" and "California (The Way I Say I Love You)". Chris Lord-Alge mixed the recordings, with assistance from Nik Karpin, at MIX LA in Tarzana, California. Ted Jensen mastered the album at Sterling Sound.

Madden's office at MDDN was down the hall; on a nightly basis after work, the Madden brothers and Cervini would work on the album for two–three hours at a time. He said the recording process felt similar to their first three albums, in that they made music solely on feeling. "Leech" features guest vocals from Sam Carter of Architects. Their manager Joey Simmrin worked at MDDN and hung out with the Madden brothers one night. The brothers were in the process of finishing up "Leech", but were unable to come up with a bridge section. Simmrin sent the track to Carter, who subsequently tracked vocals for it in Brighton, UK.

== Composition ==
The Madden brothers went into it solely to make something that sounded fun and exciting to them musically just to see what the outcome was. This process was followed for the lyrics and melodies. All of the lyrics were written by the brothers, and most of the songs were written by the brothers and Cervini. "Better Demons" was written between the brothers and Dan Lancaster, while "California (The Way I Say I Love You)" was written by the brothers, Cervini and Matthew Pauling. Lucy Landry contributed additional vocals to "Generation Rx" and "Better Demons". MUSYCA Children's Choir appear on "Leech" and "Better Demons". Pauling came up with the string arrangement for "Cold Song" and "California (The Way I Say I Love You)". Cervini and David Kaye provided additional vocals on "Better Demons".

Musically, the album's sound has been classed as pop-punk and alternative rock. Rock Sound said it was a cross between the group's The Chronicles of Life and Death (2004) and Good Morning Revival (2007) albums. The opioid epidemic inspired the album's title Generation Rx: Rx is often used as an abbreviation for medical prescriptions in the US. The album initially had the working title Cold Song, but was changed after the band realised pain was a running theme throughout the album. Generation Rx talks about several issues: the opioid epidemic, struggles with mental health, difficulty with self-esteem, and the effect of organized religion on other peoples' lives. According to Joel Madden, the album was "all about that inner struggle, and ... the emotional experience we're all going through that gets us to a place where we want to kill the pain that's in all of us".

"Actual Pain" came about shortly after the band performed at the memorial service for Peep, who was a big fan of the group. Benji Madden said the track featured elements of all of their previous albums. "Prayers" is a commentary on the culture surrounding the phrase "thoughts and prayers". The first verse was written about the relationship between Benji Madden and his wife, while the second verse was written after he had seen a Syrian refugee crying in front of rubble. Benji Madden wrote "Leech" about his childhood and his relationship with his parents, as well as trauma that he went through. Joel Madden said "California (The Way I Say I Love You)" was a "love letter" to his children, and was an attempt to give the album a "hopeful" ending.

== Release ==
In May 2018, the band posted several teasers through their Instagram account that featured skeleton figures. On May 22, the band signed a worldwide contract with major label BMG. The group explained that BMG had frequently "demonstrated the type of forward thinking, artist friendly, entrepreneurial spirit that we really relate to". On May 25, Generation Rx was announced for released in September, and its artwork was revealed. Discussing the artwork, Benji Madden said: "You can hide behind your clothes, and you can hide behind covering yourself in tattoos, or putting on masks, or whatever, but at the end of the day, your real life is in there." On the same day, "Actual Pain" was released as a single. Five days later, a music video was released for the track, directed by Jake Stark. The video begins with a man reminiscing about his youth reading comics and playing in his backyard. The group are then seen performing the track with Joel Madden's face changing into a skull mask over time.

A music video was released for "Shadowboxer" on July 13, directed by Stark. It features the band performing in an abandoned mansion. The band explained the clip was a "solitary look at what appear to be everyday people confronting the pain and struggle that is reflected back at them as they look at themselves the mirror." On August 31, "Prayers" was made available for streaming. A music video was released for the song on September 5, directed by Stark. The video details the family of one of the band's real life friends. The friend and his family are shown working and contributing to their community despite being frequently threatened with deportation from ICE. Generation Rx was released on September 14 through MDDN and BMG. Following this, the group went on a headlining US tour in October and November with support from Sleeping with Sirens, Knuckle Puck and the Dose.

A music video was released for "Self Help" on October 25, directed by Stark. It stars a boxer who aims to improve both himself and his mind. In January and February 2019, the band embarked on a European tour with support from Sleeping with Sirens, Boston Manor and the Dose. Between May and July, the group will perform a series of headlining shows and festival appearances in the US, followed by a few festival dates in Europe in August.

== Reception ==
Professional ratings
Aggregate scores
Source	Rating
Metacritic	66/100
Review scores
Source	Rating
AllMusic	3/5 stars
Classic Rock	5/10 stars
Dead Press!	8/10 stars
Exclaim!	6/10
idobi	10/10
Kerrang!	4/5
Punknews.org	2/5 stars
Rock Sound	8/10
Q	3/5 stars
Upset	4/5 stars

Generation Rx charted at number 164 on the Billboard 200. Outside of the US, it reached number 24 in Australia, number 29 in Austria, number 31 in the UK, number 32 in Switzerland, number 42 in Germany, number 61 in the Czech Republic, number 80 in Canada, number 82 in the Flanders region of Belgium, and number 127 in the Wallonia region of Belgium.

== Track listing ==
All lyrics written by Benji and Joel Madden. All songs written by Benji and Joel Madden, and Zakk Cervini, except where noted.

No.	Title	Writer(s)	Length
1.	"Generation Rx"		2:07
2.	"Self Help"		3:23
3.	"Shadowboxer"		3:05
4.	"Actual Pain"		3:43
5.	"Prayers"		3:50
6.	"Cold Song"		3:42
7.	"Leech" (featuring Sam Carter)		3:20
8.	"Better Demons"	J. Madden, B. Madden, Dan Lancaster	3:58
9.	"California (The Way I Say I Love You)"	J. Madden, B. Madden, Cervini, Matthew Pauling	4:18
Total length:			31:26

== Personnel ==
Personnel per booklet.

Good Charlotte

- Joel Madden – vocals
- Benji Madden – guitar, vocals
- Billy Martin – guitars
- Paul Thomas – bass
- Dean Butterworth – drums

Additional musicians

- Matt Pauling – string arrangement (tracks 6 and 9)
- Lucy Landry – additional vocals (tracks 1 and 8)
- MUSYCA Children's Choir – choir (tracks 7 and 8)
- Sam Carter – additional vocals (track 7)
- Zakk Cervini – additional vocals (track 8)
- David Kaye – additional vocals (track 8)

Production

- Benji Madden – producer
- Zakk Cervini – producer, engineer
- Courtney Ballard – engineer
- Jon Lundin – assistant engineer
- Chris Lord-Alge – mixing
- Nik Karpin – mixing assistant
- Ted Jensen – mastering
- Colin Schwanke – additional editing (tracks 2, 7 and 9)
- Doug Dean – artwork, layout
- Sasha Becerra – additional design
- Allie Snow – cover photo
- Ville Juurikkala – additional photography

== Charts ==
Chart performance for Generation Rx
Chart (2018)	Peak position
Australian Albums (ARIA)	24
Austrian Albums (Ö3 Austria)	29
Belgian Albums (Ultratop Flanders)	82
Belgian Albums (Ultratop Wallonia)	127
Canadian Albums (Billboard)	80
Czech Albums (ČNS IFPI)	61
German Albums (Offizielle Top 100)	42
Japanese Albums (Oricon)	117
Scottish Albums (OCC)	22
Swiss Albums (Schweizer Hitparade)	32
UK Albums (OCC)	31
US Billboard 200	164
