= Bamboozle Road Show 2010 =

2010 concert tour

The Bamboozle Road Show 2010 was the third Bamboozle Road Show, an American nationwide concert tour based on the Bamboozle Festival. Each concert in the tour featured a main stage for well-known bands and a second stage for lesser known bands to perform on. The bands who performed on the main stage on the 2010 tour were headliners All Time Low, Boys Like Girls, LMFAO and Third Eye Blind, supported by Good Charlotte, Hanson, Forever the Sickest Kids, Hellogoodbye and Cartel. Tickets went on sale on to the public on 6 March 2010. The tour included 24 shows in 17 states from 21 May to 27 June 2010 after 2 dates were cancelled due to scheduling issues. All Time Low was banned from one Texas show after they criticized the way their fans were handled at a previous show when some fans were pepper sprayed by police for fighting over a T-shirt thrown into the crowd.

== Bands ==
- All Time Low (except 6/13 & 6/24)
- Boys Like Girls
- 3OH!3 (6/2)
- LMFAO (6/10-6/26)
- Third Eye Blind (6/3-6/27)
- Good Charlotte
- Hanson (5/21-5/30)
- Travie McCoy (6/2)
- A Cursive Memory (6/5-6/6)
- Cady Groves
- Cartel (5/21-5/30)
- The Downtown Fiction (5/21-6/6 except 5/28)
- Forever the Sickest Kids
- Great Big Planes (Except 5/28)
- Hellogoodbye (6/5-6/15)
- I Fight Dragons (6/2)
- Michael and Marisa (6/24-6/27)
- Mercy Mercedes (Except 5/28)
- The Ready Set (Except 5/28)
- Shwayze (6/5-6/6)
- Simple Plan (6/18-6/27)
- Stereo Skyline (6/10-6/27)
- Vedera (6/24-6/27)
- Vita Chambers (Except 5/28)

== Tour dates ==
Date	City	Country	Venue
May 21, 2010	Columbia	United States	Merriweather Post Pavilion
May 22, 2010	Charlotte	United States	Uptown Amphitheatre at The Music Factory
May 23, 2010	Atlanta	United States	Six Flags Over Georgia
May 25, 2010	West Palm Beach	United States	Cruzan Amphitheatre
May 26, 2010	Tampa	United States	Ford Amphitheatre
May 28, 2010	Houston	United States	Verizon Wireless Theater
May 29, 2010	Arlington	United States	Six Flags Over Texas
May 30, 2010	San Antonio	United States	Six Flags Fiesta Texas
June 2, 2010	Phoenix	United States	Cricket Wireless Pavilion
June 3, 2010	Las Vegas	United States	The Joint
June 5, 2010	Concord	United States	Sleep Train Pavilion
June 6, 2010	Chula Vista	United States	Cricket Wireless Amphitheatre
June 10, 2010	Minneapolis	United States	Cabooze Plaza
June 11, 2010	Milwaukee	United States	Eagles Ballroom
June 12, 2010	Chicago	United States	Soldier Field
June 13, 2010	Eureka	United States	Six Flags St. Louis
June 15, 2010	Clarkston	United States	DTE Energy Music Theatre
June 18, 2010	Cleveland	United States	Time Warner Cable Amphitheater at Tower City
June 19, 2010	Cincinnati	United States	PNC Pavilion at Riverbend Music Center
June 20, 2010	Philadelphia	United States	Festival Pier at Penn's Landing
June 23, 2010	Pittsburgh	United States	Amphitheater at Station Square
June 24, 2010	Jackson Township	United States	Six Flags Great Adventure
June 25, 2010	Hershey	United States	Hersheypark Pavilion
June 26, 2010	Uniondale	United States	Nassau Veterans Memorial Coliseum Parking Lot
June 27, 2010	Mansfield	United States	Comcast Center

== Bamboozle tour controversy ==
During the Bamboozle Road Show of 2010, controversy arose over the use of pepper spray at a concert. A show at a Six Flags park in Arlington, Texas, according to a Six Flags spokesperson, became rowdy, and park staff used pepper spray on the crowd. Six Flags took the band off the bill on Sunday night. Singer Alex Gaskarth reported on Twitter that they had been "banned" from the park; according to Six Flags, the band chose to drop off the bill.

All Time Low was later banned from playing the rest of the Six Flags venue dates on the Bamboozle Roadshow. Alex Gaskarth posted on their official Myspace page via a blog: "I know there have been a lot of questions floating around, so I just wanted to reach out and let you guys know what's going on with the remaining Six Flags shows on the Bamboozle Roadshow tour. We'd really love to be there, but unfortunately we're not allowed to play the shows in Eureka, Missouri and Jackson, New Jersey. I promise that we'll make it all up to you very soon."
