= Youth Authority =

Studio album by Good Charlotte
- Released: July 15, 2016
- Recorded: Mid–2015
- Genres: Pop-punk; emo
- Length: 42:44
- Label: MDDN
- Producer: John Feldmann

Good Charlotte chronology
Cardiology (2010)	Youth Authority (2016)	Generation Rx (2018)

Singles from Youth Authority
- 1. "Makeshift Love" Released: November 5, 2015; 2. "40 oz. Dream" Released: May 2, 2016; 3. "Life Changes" Released: May 12, 2016; 4. "Life Can't Get Much Better" Released: June 20, 2016

Youth Authority is the sixth album by the American rock band Good Charlotte. The band went on hiatus following the release of Cardiology (2010), with the members shifting focus to their families. During this downtime, Benji and Joel Madden did production work; after working with All Time Low and 5 Seconds of Summer, the brothers, and subsequently the rest of the band, wanted to make a new album. The writing and recording process consisted of the brothers creating a song, showing it to the other members, practice and record it. Working with collaborator John Feldmann, who produced the album, sessions concluded mid-2015. After announcing the end of their hiatus in early November 2015, "Makeshift Love" was released as a single.

In early 2016, the band supported All Time Low on the UK arena tour, leading into the single release of "40 oz. Dream" in May. Preceded by the single release of "Life Can't Get Much Better" in June, Youth Authority was released in July through the Madden brothers' own label MDDN. It was promoted with performances on Warped Tour for the remainder of the month, and a handful of UK shows surrounding the band's appearance at the Reading and Leeds Festivals. A music video for "Life Changes" followed in September, as did a headlining US tour in October and November. A second headlining US tour followed in May 2017; alongside two festival appearances, a music video was released for "Keep Swingin'" in June. A few months later, a music video was released for "War"; the band closed the year with a headlining UK tour in November and December.

Youth Authority received a generally favorable reception, with the album's pop punk sound dividing critics. It charted at number 23 on the US Billboard 200, and peaked within the top 20 on five additional Billboard charts. "Makeshift Love" and "Life Can't Get Much Better" charted within the top 20 on various Billboard sales charts, with "Life Changes" charting just outside this frame. The album reached number one in Australia, where "Makeshift Love" and "Life Can't Get Much Better" peaked outside of the top 100 and top 50, respectively. Outside of these territories, the record charted within the top 20 in Switzerland, the UK, Austria, New Zealand, Germany and Canada.

== Background ==
Following the release of Cardiology in October 2010, Good Charlotte went on hiatus. At the time, the members felt burned out from the previous 12 years and decided to focus on their families. In addition, they also felt the music industry was controlling their image and ideas. Vocalist Joel Madden said they took their website offline, sold off all of their merchandise because they wanted to "go out with a clean slate." Benji and Joel Madden hosted The Voice in Australia, before forming The Madden Brothers project. They used this project to move away from Good Charlotte's pop punk sound to explore pop music. After releasing a mixtape, they began working on an album in 2012, which was eventually released as Greetings from California in 2014.

The brothers did production and song writing work for 5 Seconds of Summer, All Time Low, Three 6 Mafia, among others. Additionally, they formed MDDN, an entity that served as a record label, management and music publishing company. Guitarist Billy Martin worked as an artist/illustrator for Nickelodeon and Disney. Bassist Paul Thomas got a degree at University of California, Berkeley. Drummer Dean Butterworth served as a session musician and wrote music for TV shows. The brothers got the idea to reform Good Charlotte while working on All Time Low's Future Hearts and 5 Seconds of Summer's Sounds Good Feels Good albums in 2015. They had an interest in making pop punk music again and decided to contact the other members, who were interested in writing a new album.

== Production ==
The group wanted to return to the simplicity of their first three albums where they would write a song and record it instantaneously. Two days before recording sessions started, all of the members and their respectively families gathered at Benji Madden's house. The first day in the studio, they wrote "Life Changes". For three months, the brothers would write a song, show the rest of the band, practice it and then record it. By the end of each day, the group at least had a rough outline of a new song. They eventually went back finished up the tracks. Long-time collaborator John Feldmann acted as producer. They group had worked with Feldmann previously for a few songs, but had not recorded an album with him, which was something they had wanted to do for a while. Joel Madden said Feldmann was a "very hardworking guy, very obsessive and he expects a lot of the people he works with." Recording finished in summer 2015. Kellin Quinn of Sleeping with Sirens appears on "Keep Swingin'", while Simon Neil of Biffy Clyro features on "Reason to Stay".

== Composition ==
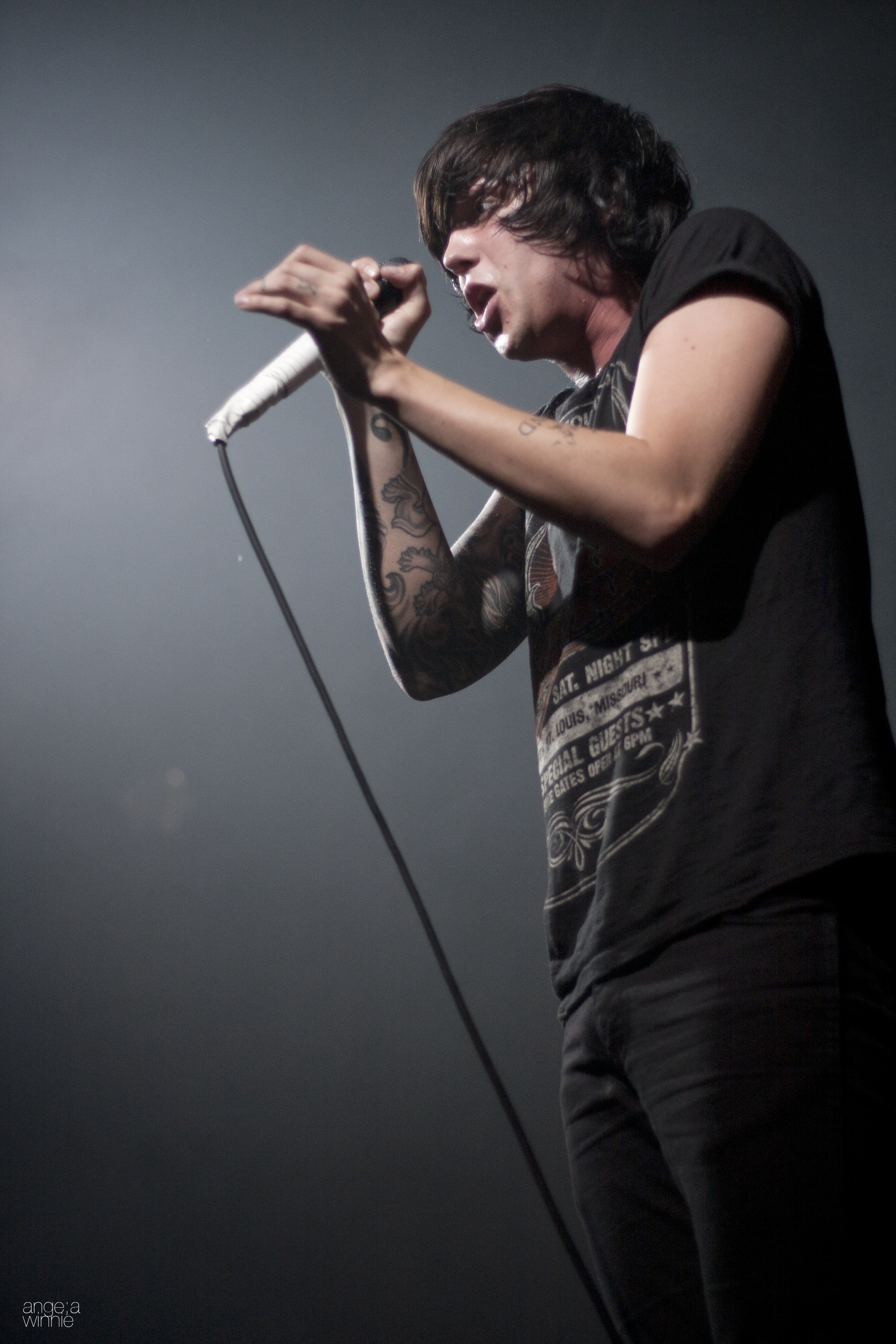
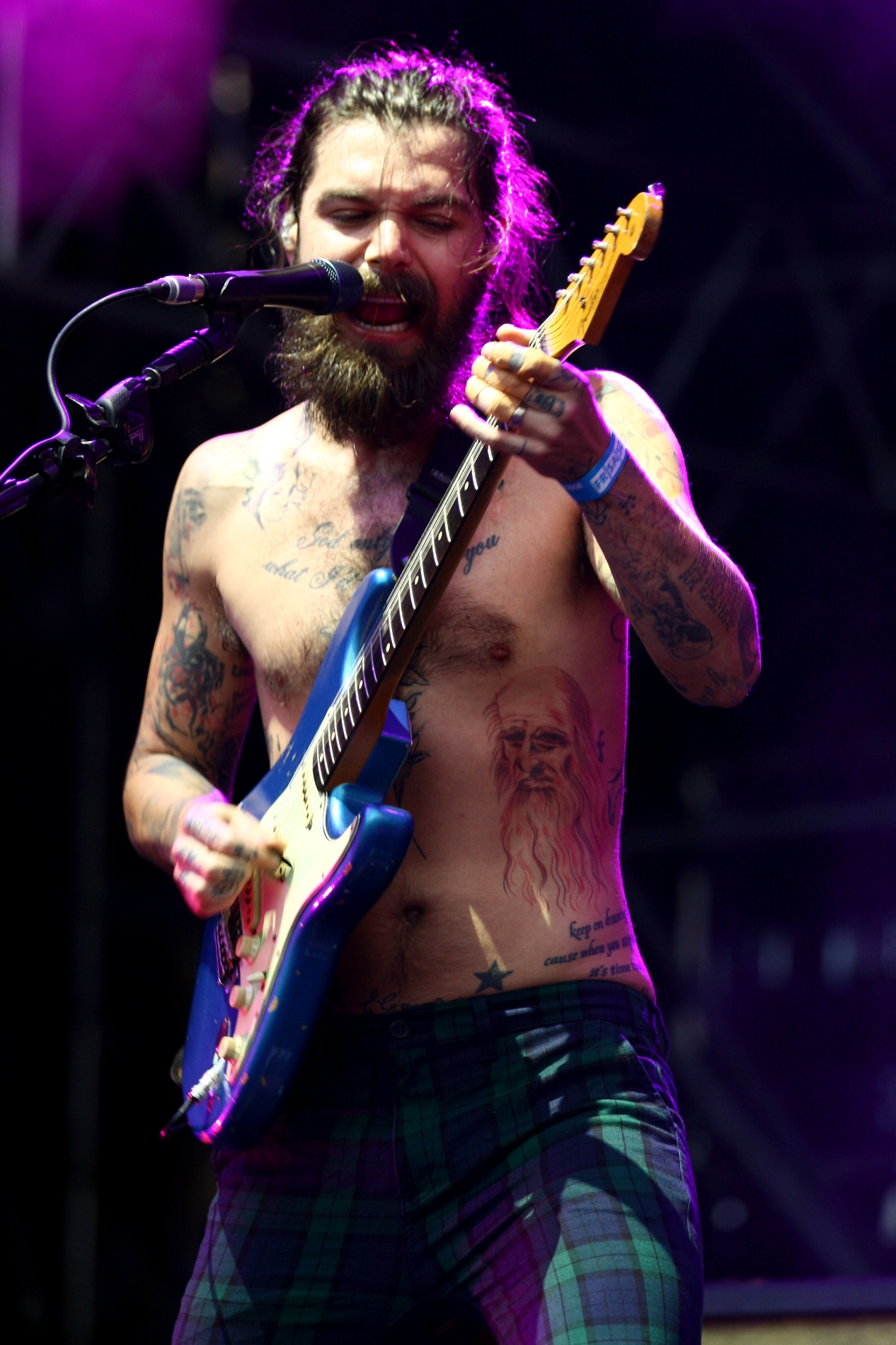
Kellin Quinn and Simon Neil feature on "Keep Swingin'" and "Reason to Stay" respectively.

Musically, the album's sound has been classed as pop-punk, emo and pop rock. Bells, acoustic guitars, piano and strings can be heard throughout the album. Discussing the album title, Madden said Youth Authority was the concept that "there's a kid out there right now who has a guitar, or a microphone, or a laptop, with a dream that is going to beat the odds". He said the album felt like the "GC of the past" with "a new energy to it". He mentioned "Life Changes" as encapsulating "the GC spirit", while having an arena rock chorus in the vein of Bon Jovi. "Makeshift Love" incorporates the sound of an iPhone, and is about being misunderstood by your significant other. "40 oz. Dream" bears resemblance to Bowling for Soup's version of "1985", and is a satirical view of the music industry.

"Keep Swingin'" was written while the Madden brothers were working with Quinn, starting off as a riff and quickly evolved into a complete song within a day. Joel Madden listened back to it the following week and was highly impressed by it, subsequently asking Quinn if they could include it on Youth Authority. The Madden brothers were in Los Angeles and hung out with Neil, who was there to write songs. Neil suggested the three of them write together, resulting in "Reason to Stay", in which he sings the first verse. The pop rock ballad features vocal effects akin to those used by Imogen Heap. Benji Madden was hesitant to include "The Outfield" on the album as it featured lyrics about his and brother's upbringing. "War", the heaviest track the group has written, recalls the mood of The Chronicles of Life and Death (2004). The main riff itself, also processed with digital delay, was seen as having been influenced by The Edge of U2. An earlier version of the track appeared on the iTunes deluxe edition of Greatest Remixes (2008). "Moving On" channels the electro-dance vibe of Good Morning Revival (2007).

== Release ==
On November 3, 2015, the band announced an end to their hiatus. Two days later, "Makeshift Love" was released as a single. In addition, a lyric video was also released, directed by Christopher Sullivan. A music video for the track, featuring Mikey Way of My Chemical Romance and Feldmann, was released on November 13 In the video, which was directed by Jake Stark, people use an app to send members of the band to break up with a significant other on their behalf. On March 30, 2016, their new album was announced for release in July. On April 1, the album title Youth Authority and artwork were revealed. The artwork was done in collaboration with artist Brian Montuori and features 192 different pieces of posters, flyers and magazines. Following a premier on Beats 1 on April 4, a lyric video was released for "40 oz. Dream", directed by Josh Madden. On the same day, the album's track listing was released.

On May 2, "40 oz. Dream" was released as a single. On May 12, "Life Changes" was made available for streaming. On June 9, a music video for "40 oz. Dream" premiered on Hot Topic's website. The video is set in a post-apocalyptic earth and sees the group as the only survivors exploring the planet. On June 13, a lyric video was released for "Life Can't Get Much Better", which features photos of fans with the band; it was released as a single on June 20. A lyric video was released for "Life Changes" on June 29; a music video for "Life Can't Get Much Better" followed on July 12, directed by Elijah Alvarado. Youth Authority was released on July 15 through the Madden brothers' own label MDDN with distribution handled by Kobalt Label Services.

The brothers said the "team [that distributes the release] is just as important as the songs." Different retailers and countries included different bonus tracks: the iTunes version included "Rise"; the Best Buy edition featured "We'll Let It All Out" and "Life Is Hard"; the Japanese edition, which was released in September, featured "We'll Let It All Out", "Life Is Hard" and "Comatose". On September 7, a music video was released for "Life Changes"; directed by Alvarado, it features footage from the All Time Low tour and Warped Tour. On June 9, 2017, a music video was released for "Keep Swingin'", which consists of tour footage. On August 22, a music video was released for "War". The video's message is about the effect relationships can have on other people. The clip focuses on a boy who hears his parents fighting; wanting to escape, he goes outside before ending up at an arcade.

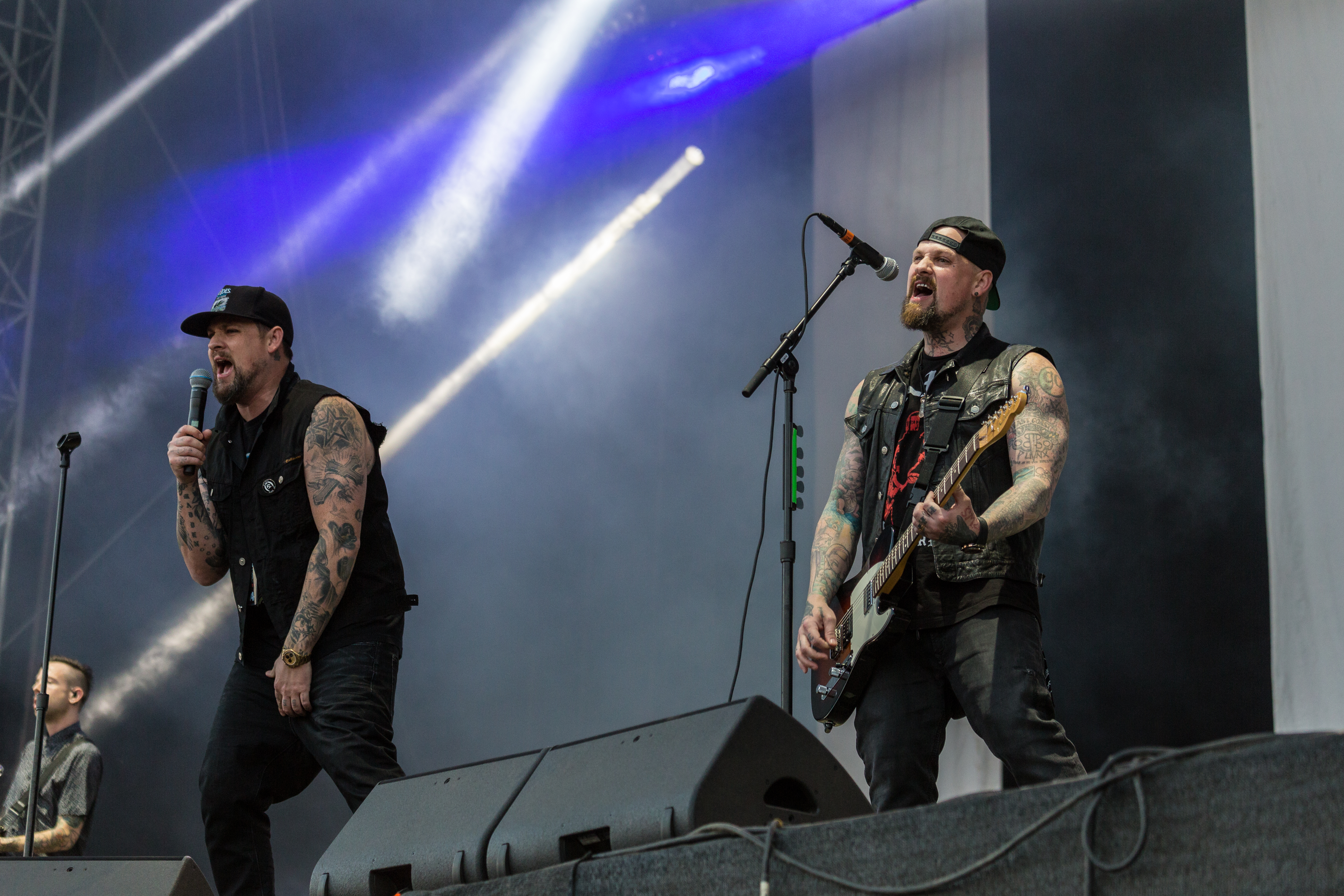
Joel and Benji Madden performing at the Nova Rock Festival

== Touring ==
The band performed its first show since its reformation on November 19, 2015, at The Troubadour in West Hollywood, California. In February 2016, the group supported All Time Low on their headlining UK arena tour. In April, the band performed four small club shows and appeared at Edgefest. Following the album's release, the band performed on the Warped Tour until the end of July. In August, the band played a few UK shows with support from Waterparks, Big Jesus and Roam, around their appearance at the Reading and Leeds Festivals. In October and November, the band went on a headlining US tour with support from The Story So Far, Set Your Goals, Four Year Strong, Hit the Lights and Big Jesus.

In May 2017, the group went on a headlining US tour with support from Less Than Jake, Crown the Empire and Like Pacific, and performed in Mexico as part of Warped Tour Mexico. Following this, the group appeared at the Download Festival in the UK and the Nova Rock Festival in Austria. Following this, the band participated in the Warped Rewind at Sea cruise in October. In November and December, the group went on a headlining UK tour with support from Against the Current, Milk Teeth and Nothing,Nowhere.

== Reception ==
Professional ratings
Aggregate scores
Source	Rating
AnyDecentMusic?	4.8/10
Metacritic	66/100
Review scores
Source	Rating
AllMusic	3.5/5 stars
Alternative Press	Mixed
The A.V. Club	B−
Cleveland.com	B+
Consequence of Sound	C−
Dead Press!	6/10 stars
Rock Sound	8/10
Rolling Stone Australia	3.5/4 stars
Spin	6/10
Ultimate Guitar	6.7/10

=== Critical response ===
Youth Authority received generally favourable reviews, according to review aggregator Metacritic, and scored an average of 4.8/10 at AnyDecentMusic?. AllMusic reviewer Stephen Thomas Erlewine called it a "record that gleams but also roars, an album that still feels the pull of adolescent rebellion even as middle age sentimentality begins to descend." Alternative Press writer Evan Lucy complimented Feldmann's production, noting that he "helped the Maddens channel the emotional heft that’s always been at the core of their music." The A.V. Club's Annie Zaleski viewed the overbearing underdog stance as very "wearying" throughout the album. The release, however, provides an "admirable job updating Good Charlotte’s sound in ways that should please both long-term and new fans."

Katherine Flynn of Consequence of Sound said that it "actually doesn’t sound terrible", however, found that the brothers "don’t have a whole lot left to sing about, though; the songs’ substance begins and ends with their power chords." Spin's said the album's weaknesses lied with the slower material: "Nailing ballads was never a strength for GC, and why would it be? It’s their angst-ridden, palm-muted power chords that leave the kids swooning." A number of songs in the album's mid-way point end up "muddling" that section; the album was at its "sharpest on its edges." Dead Press! reviewer Andy Roberts called it a "fresh collection of ultimately underwhelming, pop-punk, filler tracks." With it being soaked in nostalgia, the album is "jam-packed full of Good Charlotte‘s playing-it-safe pop-punk and, as a consequence, is a pretty bland effort."

Troy L. Smith Cleveland.com found it an "immensely enjoyable experience" to listen to. The band proved they could remain on top "when it comes to crafting the kind of catchy hooks teens in the scene live for." Rock Sound's Ryan Bird praised it as a "sun-drenched delight that sees the quintet firmly reconnecting with their roots." He added that "one of the most endearing qualities" found on the album was its "lyrical honesty. … It’s relatable, it’s straight-talking, and it’s very, very real." Rolling Stone Australia writer Rod Yates said the band stuck to their strengths, namely "polished pop-punk bangers, … quirky radio fodder, … and lyrics that veer from the defiant … to the confessional." Ultimate Guitar's editorial team wrote that the album was "more than just a reboot to the sound they began with", though the way they update their sound was a "predictable direction that's not the most cutting-edge, but it's a direction that's sufficiently executed."

=== Commercial performance and legacy ===
Youth Authority charted at number 23 on the Billboard 200, and appeared on five additional Billboard charts: number three on the Independent Albums chart, number four on the Alternative Albums and Top Rock Albums charts, number five on the Digital Albums chart, and number 11 on the Top Album Sales Albums chart. By May 2018, the album had sold 30,000 copies in the US. In Australia, it sold 3883 copies in its first week, becoming one of the lowest-selling albums to reach number one in that territory. Outside of the US and Australia, the album reached number eight in Scotland, number nine in Scotland, number 13 in the UK, number 15 in Austria and New Zealand, number 17 in Germany, number 20 in Canada, number 33 in France, number 45 in the Flanders region of Belgium, number 77 in the Netherlands, and number 116 in the Wallonia region of Belgium.

"Makeshift Love" charted at number nine on the Alternative Digital Song Sales and Rock Digital Song Sales charts, and number 30 on the Hot Rock Songs chart. "Life Can't Get Much Better" charted at number nine on the Rock Digital Song Sales chart, number 10 on the Alternative Digital Song Sales number 19 on the Hot Rock Songs chart. "Life Changes" charted at number 42 on the Rock Digital Song Sales chart. "Makeshift Love" charted at number 104 in Australia; "Life Can't Get Much Better" performed slightly better in that country, reaching number 51.

It was included at number 23 on Rock Sound's best releases of 2016. In 2019, Benji Madden viewed it as a "warm up record. We were having fun, it was nice to be back with the guys, and I think there were moments of conviction on it, but I don’t know if we dug as deep." That same year, Joel Madden said it didn't completely embody what was going on in their headspace at the time. Adding that two of the songs were on it solely because the band felt they had to include them.

== Track listing ==
All songs written by Benji Madden, Joel Madden, and John Feldmann, except where noted.

No.	Title	Writer(s)	Length
1.	"Life Changes"		3:02
2.	"Makeshift Love"	B. Madden; J. Madden; Feldmann; Nick Furlong	3:43
3.	"40 oz. Dream"		3:20
4.	"Life Can't Get Much Better"		3:24
5.	"Keep Swingin'" (featuring Kellin Quinn)		3:13
6.	"Reason to Stay" (featuring Simon Neil)		3:47
7.	"Stray Dogs"		3:54
8.	"Stick to Your Guns (Interlude)"		1:28
9.	"The Outfield"		3:32
10.	"Cars Full of People"		4:38
11.	"War"		4:45
12.	"Moving On"		3:58
Total length:			42:44

iTunes bonus tracks
No.	Title	Length
13.	"Rise"	3:22

Best Buy bonus tracks
No.	Title	Length
13.	"We'll Let It All Out"	4:34
14.	"Life Is Hard"	3:36

Japanese bonus tracks
No.	Title	Length
13.	"We'll Let It All Out"	4:34
14.	"Life Is Hard"	3:36
15.	"Comatose"	3:59

== Personnel ==
Good Charlotte

- Joel Madden – vocals, executive production
- Benji Madden – guitars, vocals, executive production
- Billy Martin – guitars
- Paul Thomas – bass
- Dean Butterworth – drums, percussion

Additional musicians

- Kellin Quinn – additional vocals on "Keep Swingin'"
- Simon Neil – additional vocals on "Reason to Stay"
- Zac Solomon – horns

Production

- John Feldmann – production
- Zakk Cervini – engineering, editing, programming, additional production
- Matt Pauling – engineering, editing, programming, additional production
- Tyler Sheppard – additional editing
- Courtney Ballard – additional editing, additional vocal editing
- Devon Corey – additional editing
- Zach Tuch – additional editing, assistant
- Allie Snow – assistant
- Tom Baker – mastering
- Ben Grosse – mixing except for "Makeshift Love"
- Eric Valentine – mixing on "Makeshift Love"

Artwork

- Brian Montuori – art direction
- Aaron Farley – artwork photography
- Justin Coit – portrait photography

== Charts ==
Chart (2016)	Peak position
Australian Albums (ARIA)	1
Austrian Albums (Ö3 Austria)	15
Belgian Albums (Ultratop Flanders)	45
Belgian Albums (Ultratop Wallonia)	116
Canadian Albums (Billboard)	20
Dutch Albums (Album Top 100)	77
French Albums (SNEP)	33
German Albums (Offizielle Top 100)	17
New Zealand Albums (RMNZ)	15
Scottish Albums (Official Charts)	9
Swiss Albums (Schweizer Hitparade)	8
UK Albums (Official Charts)	13
US Billboard 200	23
US Top Rock Albums (Billboard)	4
