= Motel Du Cap =

Studio album by Good Charlotte
- Released: August 8, 2025
- Genre: Pop-punk
- Length: 41:16
- Label: Atlantic
- Producer: Johan Carlsson; Zakk Cervini; Jordan Fish; Andrew Goldstein; Charlie Puth

Good Charlotte chronology
Generation Rx (2018)	Motel Du Cap (2025)

Singles from Motel Du Cap
- 1. "Rejects" Released: June 25, 2025; 2. "Stepper" Released: July 18, 2025; 3. "I Don't Work Here Anymore" Released: August 8, 2025

Professional ratings
Review scores
Source	Rating
The AU Review	3/5 stars
Classic Rock	3/5 stars
Kerrang!	4/5
laut.de	3/5 stars
Stereoboard	3/5 stars

Motel Du Cap is the eighth album by the American rock band Good Charlotte, released on August 8, 2025, under Atlantic Records. It is their first album in seven years, following 2018's Generation Rx. The album was announced on June 17, with the lead single "Rejects" released on June 25. This marks the band's first album without their drummer Dean Butterworth after his departure from the band in early 2025.

== Track listing ==
Motel Du Cap track listing
No.	Title	Writer(s)	Length
1.	"Check in at Motel Du Cap"	Benji Madden; Joel Madden; Mattias Bylund	1:45
2.	"Rejects"	B. Madden; J. Madden; Zakk Cervini; Jordan Fish	2:55
3.	"Stepper"	B. Madden; J. Madden; Cervini; Fish	3:16
4.	"I Don't Work Here Anymore"	B. Madden; J. Madden; Jacob Kasher; Nick Long; Jake Torrey	3:41
5.	"Life Is Great" (featuring Wiz Khalifa)	B. Madden; J. Madden; Cervini; Fish; Matthew Koma; Wiz Khalifa	2:53
6.	"Pink Guitar" (featuring Zeph)	B. Madden; J. Madden; Cervini; Fish; Zephani Jong	3:08
7.	"Deserve You" (featuring Luke Borchelt)	B. Madden; J. Madden; Luke Borchelt; Cervini; Fish; Lil Aaron	3:23
8.	"Mean"	B. Madden; J. Madden; Cervini; Fish	2:51
9.	"Bodies"	B. Madden; J. Madden; Mitchel Cave; Cervini; Fish	2:57
10.	"Vertigo" (featuring Petti Hendrix)	B. Madden; J. Madden; Cervini; Fish; Petti Hendrix; Lil Aaron	2:34
11.	"The Dress Rehearsal"	B. Madden; J. Madden; Johan Carlsson; Charlie Puth	3:05
12.	"Castle in the Sand"	B. Madden; Carlsson	3:13
13.	"GC Forever"	B. Madden; J. Madden; Cervini; Fish	5:36
Total length:			41:16

== Personnel ==
Credits adapted from Tidal.

=== Good Charlotte ===
- Benji Madden – guitar, vocals (all tracks); bass, keyboards (track 11)
- Joel Madden – vocals
- Paul Thomas – bass
- Billy Martin – guitar

=== Additional musicians ===
- Ian Longwell – drums (1–11, 13)
- Mattias Bylund – strings arrangement (1, 4, 11, 13), string synthesizer (4, 12), conductor (12)
- David Bukovinszky – cello (1, 4, 11–13)
- Mattias Johansson – violin (1, 4, 11–13)
- Erik Arvinder – conductor (1, 4, 11, 13), strings arrangement (4)
- Bård Ericson – double bass (1, 4, 11, 13)
- Erik Holm – viola (1, 4, 11, 13)
- James Opie – viola (1, 4, 11, 13)
- Vidar Andersson Meilink – viola (1, 4, 11, 13)
- Anna Roos Stefansson – violin (1, 4, 11, 13)
- Daniel Bonfiglioli – violin (1, 4, 11, 13)
- Fredrik Syberg – violin (1, 4, 11, 13)
- Jannika Gustafsson – violin (1, 4, 11, 13)
- Lola Torrente – violin (1, 4, 11, 13)
- Oscar Treitler – violin (1, 4, 11, 13)
- Stockholm Studio Orchestra – orchestra (1, 11, 13)
- Andreas Lavotha – cello (1, 11, 13)
- Fred Lindberg – cello (1, 11, 13)
- Pelle Hansen – cello (1, 11, 13)
- Samuel Coppin – cello (1, 11, 13)
- Sigrid Granit – double bass (1, 11, 13)
- Riikka Repo – viola (1, 11, 13)
- Carl Vallin – violin (1, 11, 13)
- Claudia Bonfiglioli – violin (1, 11, 13)
- Daniel Migdal – violin (1, 11, 13)
- Paul Waltman – violin (1, 11, 13)
- Åsa Wirdefeldt – violin (1, 11, 13)
- Marcus Anderson – voiceover (1)
- Andrew Goldstein – additional guitar, additional vocals, keyboards, programming (4)
- Antonio Roland – cello (4)
- Peter Volpert – cello (4)
- Tomas Lundström – cello (4)
- Christopher Öhman – viola (4)
- Iskandar Komilov – violin (4)
- Patrik Swedrup – violin (4)
- Sofie Sunnerstam – violin (4)
- Veronika Novotna – violin (4)
- Yongmin Lee – violin (4)
- Wiz Khalifa – vocals (5)
- Zeph – vocals (6)
- Luke Borchelt – vocals (7)
- Petti Hendrix – vocals (10)
- Johan Carlsson – guitar (11, 12); bass, keyboards (11); piano (12)
- Charlie Puth – bass, guitar, keyboards (11)
- Svend Lurch – drums (12)
- Karl Guner – string synthesizer (12)
- Hanna Helgegren – violin (12)

=== Technical ===
- Jordan Fish – production (1–3, 5–10, 13)
- Zakk Cervini – production (2–10, 13), mixing (all tracks)
- Andrew Goldstein – production (4)
- Charlie Puth – production, engineering (11)
- Johan Carlsson – production (12)
- Warren Russell – additional production (7)
- Ted Jensen – mastering
- Erik Arvinder – engineering (1, 4, 11, 13), strings engineering (13)
- Willem Bleeker – engineering (1, 4, 11, 13)
- Nick Morzov – engineering (4)
- Svend Lerch – engineering (11–13)
- Mattias Bylund – engineering (12), strings engineering (1, 4, 11, 12), editing (1, 4, 11)
- Julian Gargiulo – mixing assistance

== Charts ==
Chart performance for Motel Du Cap
Chart (2025)	Peak position
Australian Albums (ARIA)	47
Hungarian Albums (MAHASZ)	30
Japanese Download Albums (Billboard)	83
Scottish Albums (OCC)	40
Swiss Albums (Schweizer Hitparade)	71
UK Albums Sales (OCC)	18
UK Rock & Metal Albums (OCC)	3
US Top Album Sales (Billboard)	43
US Top Current Album Sales (Billboard)	27
