= Greetings from California =

Studio album by The Madden Brothers
- Released: September 12, 2014
- Genres: Pop rock; Folk rock
- Length: 51:05
- Label: Capitol
- Producers: Eric Valentine; Joe Chiccarelli

The Madden Brothers chronology
Before – Volume One (2011)	Greetings from California (2014)

Singles from Greetings from California
- 1. "We Are Done" Released: May 30, 2014; 2. "Dear Jane" Released: September 2, 2014; 3. "U R (featuring Ziggy Marley)" Released: October 6, 2026

2026 Good Charlotte deluxe reissue
- Greetings from California (Deluxe), released November 6, 2026, by Good Charlotte.

Good Charlotte chronology
Motel Du Cap (2025)	Greetings from California (Deluxe) (2026)

Professional ratings
Aggregate scores
Source	Rating
Metacritic	63/100
Review scores
Source	Rating
AllMusic	4/5 stars
Rolling Stone	2/5 stars
The National	3/5 stars
The Soundboard	6/10

Greetings from California is the debut studio album by American pop rock duo The Madden Brothers, consisting of twin brothers Joel and Benji Madden of the rock band Good Charlotte. The album was originally released on September 12, 2014, in Australia and September 16, 2014, in the United States, through Capitol Records.

The album's lead single, "We Are Done", premiered on May 30, 2014, on 102.7 KIIS FM. Its music video premiered on June 30, 2014. The album was made available for pre-order on the iTunes Store on July 4, 2014, with "California Rain" offered as an immediate download.

The album is divided into two stylistically distinct halves. The first features upbeat pop rock produced by longtime collaborator Eric Valentine, who previously worked on Good Charlotte's The Young and the Hopeless and The Chronicles of Life and Death. The second half, produced by Joe Chiccarelli, draws inspiration from 1970s FM pop.

After being removed from digital streaming platforms in 2015, the album was reissued under the Good Charlotte name on November 6, 2026, as Greetings from California (Deluxe). The expanded edition, released through MDDN and Atlantic Records, includes three additional tracks featuring Ziggy Marley, Eyedress, and a live performance of "We Are Done".

== Critical reception ==
Greetings from California received mixed reviews from music critics. At Metacritic, which assigns a weighted average score out of 100 to reviews from mainstream publications, the album received an average score of 63 based on five reviews, indicating "generally favorable reviews" according to the website's classification.

Stephen Thomas Erlewine of AllMusic gave the album four out of five stars, praising the brothers' embrace of California-inspired pop music and their ability to draw from classic influences without producing an entirely retro-sounding record. Erlewine highlighted the album's polished production, melodic hooks, and references to surf rock, new wave, and yacht rock, describing it as a successful continuation of the bubblegum pop tradition.

The Boston Globe responded positively to the album's musical diversity, noting the contrast between the Caribbean-influenced power pop of its first half and the more relaxed material on its second. The publication praised the arrangements and harmonies, while observing that the album's seemingly laid-back sound contained an underlying emotional tension.

Kerrang! viewed the album as a demonstration of Joel and Benji Madden's musical maturity beyond their work with Good Charlotte. Alternative Press offered a more mixed assessment, praising the 1960s-inspired pop of "We Are Done" and "California Rain" while criticizing the inconsistency of the remaining material.

In a more negative review, Rolling Stone awarded the album two out of five stars. The publication criticized its polished production for diminishing the authenticity of the brothers' songwriting, despite acknowledging the record's 1970s pop influences.

Saeed Saeed of The National gave the album three out of five stars, describing it as a well-produced collection of pop rock influenced by the Beach Boys, the Eagles, and Electric Light Orchestra. He praised "Dear Jane", "Out of My Mind", and "We Are Done", but criticized "California Rain" and "Bad" for their lack of energy. Saeed concluded that the album felt more like a temporary diversion from Good Charlotte than the beginning of a lasting new project.

Luke Nuttall of The Soundboard awarded the album six out of ten, praising "We Are Done", "Brother", and "Jealousy (All Your Friends in Silverlake)" while criticizing other tracks for being overly sentimental or forgettable. He considered the album an uneven but worthwhile exploration of the brothers' musical development.

Mike Usinger of The Georgia Straight offered a favorable assessment, praising the brothers' departure from their pop-punk roots. He highlighted "Dear Jane", "Brixton", "U R", and "Jealousy (All Your Friends in Silverlake)", commending the album's melodies, arrangements, and stylistic experimentation.

== 2026 reissue ==
On November 6, 2026, Good Charlotte reissued Greetings from California as an expanded deluxe edition, twelve years after its original release under The Madden Brothers name. The album had been unavailable on major streaming services since 2015.

The reissue was repackaged and reclassified as a Good Charlotte release, with three additional recordings: a new version of "U R" featuring reggae musician Ziggy Marley, a version of "Jealousy (All Your Friends in Silverlake)" with musician Eyedress, and a live recording of "We Are Done" from Good Charlotte's 2026 Motel Du Cap tour.

The reimagined version of "U R", featuring Ziggy Marley, was released as a single on October 6, 2026, ahead of the deluxe edition.

Discussing the decision to reissue the album, Joel and Benji Madden explained that they had originally withdrawn it from circulation because they wanted to keep it for themselves, but later reconsidered its place in the Good Charlotte catalogue. The brothers stated that, in retrospect, the album could have been released as a Good Charlotte record from the beginning.

A special double-LP edition on gold vinyl, featuring the expanded track listing and new artwork, was scheduled for release on November 27, 2026, as part of Record Store Day Black Friday. The deluxe edition is also listed in the discography on Good Charlotte's official website.

== Track listing ==
No.	Title	Writer(s)	Producer(s)	Length
1.	"Dear Jane (Intro)"			0:21
2.	"Dear Jane"	Eric Valentine; Benji Madden; Joel Madden	Valentine	3:37
3.	"Brixton"	Valentine; B. Madden; J. Madden	Valentine	4:08
4.	"Out of My Mind"	Valentine; B. Madden; J. Madden	Valentine	3:13
5.	"We Are Done"	Valentine; B. Madden; J. Madden	Valentine	3:36
6.	"U R"	Valentine; B. Madden; J. Madden; Nasri Atweh; Adam Messinger	Valentine	3:56
7.	"Jealousy (All Your Friends in Silverlake)"	Valentine; B. Madden; J. Madden; Jared Poythress	Valentine	3:33
8.	"Love Pretenders"	Valentine; B. Madden; J. Madden; Ross Golan	Valentine	3:09
9.	"California Rain (Intro)"			0:11
10.	"California Rain"	Pharrell Williams; B. Madden; J. Madden	Joe Chiccarelli; The Madden Brothers	4:40
11.	"Brother"	B. Madden; J. Madden	Chiccarelli; The Madden Brothers	5:00
12.	"Bad"	B. Madden; J. Madden	Chiccarelli; The Madden Brothers	3:40
13.	"Good Gracious Abbey"	Williams; B. Madden; J. Madden	Chiccarelli; The Madden Brothers	4:02
14.	"Suddenly"	B. Madden; J. Madden; Dan Keyes	Chiccarelli; The Madden Brothers	3:28
15.	"Empty Spirits"	B. Madden; J. Madden; Golan; Wes Lang	Chiccarelli; The Madden Brothers	4:22
Total length:				51:05

=== 2026 deluxe edition ===
The 2026 deluxe edition retains the original fifteen tracks and adds three bonus recordings.

Greetings from California (Deluxe) – bonus tracks
No.	Title	Featured artist	Length
16.	"U R"	Ziggy Marley	3:55
17.	"Jealousy (All Your Friends in Silverlake)"	Eyedress	3:15
18.	"We Are Done (Live from the Motel Du Cap Tour)"		4:23

== Charts ==
=== Weekly charts ===
Chart (2014)	Peak position
Australian Albums (ARIA)	1
New Zealand Albums (RMNZ)	2

=== Year-end charts ===
Chart (2014)	Position
Australian Albums Chart	65

== Release history ==
Region	Date	Format(s)	Label
Australia	September 12, 2014	CD; LP; digital download	Capitol
New Zealand	September 12, 2014	CD; LP; digital download	Capitol
United States	September 16, 2014	CD; LP; digital download	Capitol
Worldwide	November 6, 2026	Digital download, streaming (deluxe edition)	MDDN / Atlantic
Participating Record Store Day retailers	November 27, 2026	2×LP (deluxe edition)	Atlantic
