= Predictable (Good Charlotte song) =

2004 single by Good Charlotte

Single by Good Charlotte

from the album The Chronicles of Life and Death
- B-side: "Meet My Maker"
- Released: September 27, 2004
- Length: 3:11
- Label: Epic; Daylight
- Songwriter(s): Benji Madden; Joel Madden
- Producer(s): Eric Valentine

Good Charlotte singles chronology
"Hold On" (2003)	"Predictable" (2004)	"I Just Wanna Live" (2005)

Music video
- "Predictable" on YouTube

"Predictable" is the lead single from American rock band Good Charlotte's third studio album, The Chronicles of Life and Death (2004). This was the first single released that featured Chris Wilson as the band's drummer. The song was also released in a Japanese version; in this version, only Benji Madden sings the Japanese part because he is the only one who knows Japanese.

Released on September 27, 2004, "Predictable" reached the top 20 in Australia and the United Kingdom, where it topped the UK Rock Chart for a week. The song's music video, inspired by the film Edward Scissorhands, takes place in a town drawn by the guitarist Billy Martin, with the band in a house singing the English version. The song was used for a commercial of Donkey Konga 2, and members of Good Charlotte also appear in the commercial.

== Track listing ==
Australia single

1. "Predictable"
2. "The Chronicles of Life and Death" (acoustic version)
3. "The Anthem" (live from the Abbey Road sessions)
4. "Hold On" (live from the Abbey Road sessions)
5. "Predictable" (video)

== Charts ==
Chart (2004)	Peak position
Australia (ARIA)	15
Austria (Ö3 Austria Top 40)	43
Belgium (Ultratip Bubbling Under Wallonia)	17
Canada CHR/Pop Top 30 (Radio & Records)	23
Germany (GfK)	29
Hungary (Single Top 40)	10
Ireland (IRMA)	33
Netherlands (Single Top 100)	39
New Zealand (Recorded Music NZ)	27
Scotland (OCC)	12
Sweden (Sverigetopplistan)	48
Switzerland (Schweizer Hitparade)	45
UK Singles (OCC)	12
UK Rock & Metal (OCC)	1
US Bubbling Under Hot 100 (Billboard)	6
US Alternative Airplay (Billboard)	28
US Pop Airplay (Billboard)	20

== Release history ==
Region	Date	Format(s)	Label(s)	Ref(s).
United States	August 23, 2004	Contemporary hit; alternative radio	Epic; Daylight	
Australia	September 27, 2004	CD	Epic; Daylight	
United Kingdom	October 4, 2004	CD	Epic; Daylight	
