= List of awards and nominations received by Good Charlotte =

Good Charlotte awards and nominations
Awards and nominations
Award	Wins	Nominations
MTV Australia	1	3
MTV Europe	0	4
MTV VMA	1	5
MTV Japan	1	1
Much	1	1
Nickelodeon Australian Kids' Choice	1	1
NRJ	1	1
Kerrang! Awards	1	3

Totals (Note: Certain award groups do not simply award one winner. They acknowledge several different recipients, have runners-up, and have third place. Since this is a specific recognition and is different from losing an award, runner-up mentions are considered wins in this award tally. For simplification and to avoid errors, each award in this list has been presumed to have had a prior nomination.)
- Wins: 9
- Nominations: 21

Good Charlotte's songs and albums have received recognition at the MTV Australia Awards, the MTV Europe Music Awards, and the MTV Video Music Awards. "The Anthem" is the second single from the band's second album The Young and the Hopeless. The song was awarded the "Best Rock Video" award from the MTV Video Music Awards Japan and the "Peoples Choice: Favorite International Group" award from the MuchMusic Video Awards. The band itself has received awards including "Fave International Band" at the Nickelodeon Australian Kids' Choice Awards, "Best International Group" at the NRJ Music Awards, and "Best International Rock Act" at the TMF Awards. As of 2020, Good Charlotte has received nine awards from twenty-one nominations.

== Kerrang! Awards ==
The Kerrang! Awards is an annual awards ceremony held by Kerrang!, a British rock magazine.

Year	Nominee / work	Award	Result
2003	"Lifestyles of the Rich and Famous"	Best Single	Won
2003	Good Charlotte	Best International Band	Nominated
2005	"The Chronicles of Life and Death"	Best Video	Nominated

== MTV Australia Awards ==
The MTV Australia Awards is an annual awards ceremony established in 2005 by MTV Australia.

Year	Nominee / work	Award	Result
2007	"Keep Your Hands off My Girl"	Viewers Choice Australia	Won
2007	"Keep Your Hands off My Girl"	Best Group	Nominated
2007	"Keep Your Hands off My Girl"	Best Rock Video	Nominated

== MTV Europe Music Awards ==
The MTV Europe Music Awards is an annual awards ceremony established in 1994 by MTV Europe.

Year	Nominee / work	Award	Result
2003	Good Charlotte	Best Rock	Nominated
2003	Good Charlotte	Best New Act	Nominated
2004	Good Charlotte	Best Rock	Nominated
2007	Good Charlotte	Best Band	Nominated

== MTV Video Music Awards ==
The MTV Video Music Awards were established in 1984 by MTV to celebrate the top music videos of the year.

Year	Nominee / work	Award	Result
2003	"Lifestyles of the Rich and Famous"	Viewer's Choice	Won
2003	"Lifestyles of the Rich and Famous"	Best Rock Video	Nominated
2003	"Lifestyles of the Rich and Famous"	Best Group Video	Nominated
2004	"Hold On"	Best Group Video	Nominated
2004	"Hold On"	Viewer's Choice	Nominated

== MTV Video Music Awards Japan ==
The MTV Video Music Awards Japan was established in 2002 and is presented by MTV Japan.

Year	Nominee / work	Award	Result
2004	"The Anthem"	Best Rock Video	Won

== MuchMusic Video Awards ==
The MuchMusic Video Awards is an annual awards ceremony presented by the Canadian music video channel MuchMusic.

Year	Nominee / work	Award	Result
2003	"The Anthem"	People's Choice: Favorite International Group	Won

== Nickelodeon Australian Kids' Choice Awards ==
The Nickelodeon Australian Kids' Choice Awards is an annual awards show which comments entertainers and is voted by children aged 12 to 19.

Year	Nominee / work	Award	Result
2007	Good Charlotte	Fave International Band	Won

== NRJ Music Awards ==
The NRJ Music Awards is an annual French awards ceremony created by the NRJ radio station and the TF1 television network.

Year	Nominee / work	Award	Result
2004	Good Charlotte	Best International Group	Won

== Alternative Press Music Awards ==
The Alternative Press Music Awards was an annual music awards show in the United States, founded by the music magazine Alternative Press.

Year	Nominee / work	Award	Result
2016	Good Charlotte	Classic Album Award	Won

== Teen Choice Awards ==
Year	Nominee / work	Award	Result	Ref.
2003	Good Charlotte	Choice Rock Group	Won	
2003	The Young and the Hopeless	Choice Album	Won	
2004	Good Charlotte	Choice Rock Group	Nominated	
2004	"Hold On"	Choice Rock Track	Nominated	
