= The Madden Brothers =

American rock duo

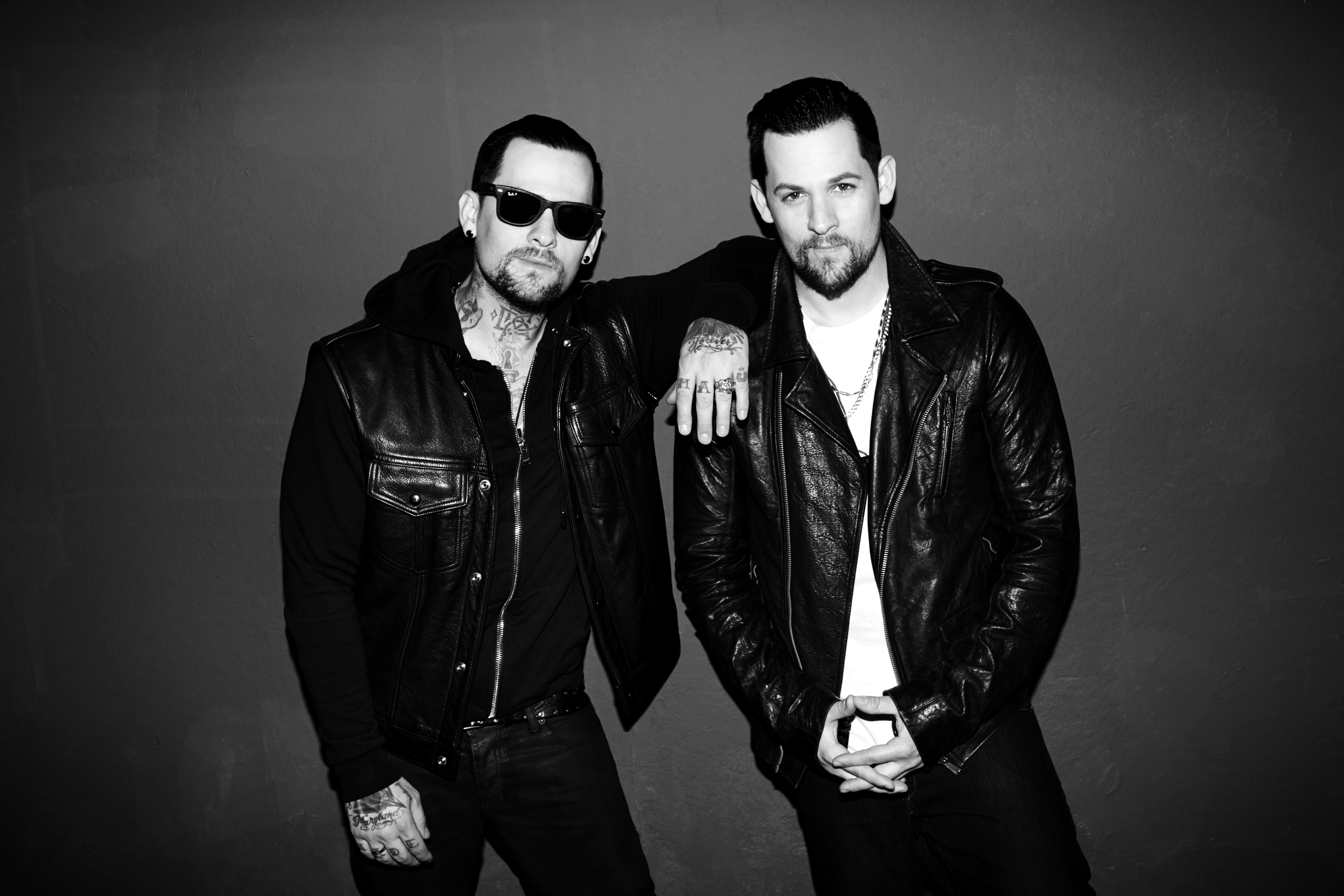

Background information
- Origin: Waldorf, Maryland, U.S.
- Genres: Pop rock; folk rock
- Years active: 2011–present
- Label: Capitol
- Spinoff of: Good Charlotte
- Members: Joel Madden; Benji Madden
- Website: themaddenbrothers.com

The Madden Brothers are an American pop rock duo made up of the identical twin brothers Joel Madden and Benji Madden, both of whom are also founding members of the rock band Good Charlotte.

== History ==
Twin brothers Joel and Benji Madden formed The Madden Brothers officially in 2014 as a side project separate from Good Charlotte, but have origins dating back to 2011. While with Good Charlotte, Joel was mainly the lead vocalist with Benji being lead guitarist and backup vocalist. They released a total of five studio albums, two live albums, two extended plays, twenty singles, seventeen music videos and three music DVDs. All of their studio albums received certification including The Young and the Hopeless, which was certified 3× Platinum in the United States and reached number 1 on the Canadian Albums Chart. During their time with Good Charlotte, the brothers saw the sale of over ten million albums worldwide.

Joel and Benji had been working on The Madden Brothers project since 2011 when they began working on different ways of music. They released a free mixtape a short time later in October 2011. Titled Before — Volume One, it included collaborations with artists such as Casey Veggies, Wiz Khalifa, Machine Gun Kelly, Rockie Fresh, and The Cool Kids and was said to be made simply for the fun of music.

The Madden Brothers began working with producer Pharrell Williams and planned to release an album in late 2012. The plans fell through for the album release but both continued to work on the project. In 2013, the Madden Brothers lend their voices to animated versions of themselves in the form of two characters, depicted as twin lizard punk rockers and brothers (hence their tattoo-like stripes and/or spots on their scaly skins) created by Michael Patterson.

The Madden Brothers finally released their first single in June 2014. Titled "We Are Done", the song was placed in regular rotation in major markets and became a top 40 track on Billboard's Bubbling Under Hot 100 Singles and Alternative Radio charts. It is a song about standing up for yourself according to Benji, made to inspire people to speak up for themselves. The duo performed in the 88th annual Macy's Thanksgiving Day Parade that same year.

The Madden Brothers were coaches on the inaugural season of The Voice Kids Australia as well as Benji joining Joel as a coach on Seasons 4 and 5 of The Voice Australia until their departure in Season 6 who then got replaced by Boy George.

The Madden Brothers also began their own music company, MDDN. In 2015, they signed the band Chase Atlantic and worked with them. Chase Atlantic member Clinton Cave said, "The Maddens locked us away in a Burbank Studio for three months and threw away the key." The two brothers worked hard with the band together until they signed a deal with Warner Brothers Music.

== Band members ==
Current Members

- Joel Madden – lead and backing vocals (2011–present)
- Benji Madden – guitar, lead and backing vocals (2011–present)

Session studio musicians

- Dean Butterworth – drums, percussion (2011–2014)
- Serg Dimitrijevic – lead guitar, bass (2011–2014)
- Vintz Scheuerman – bass, rhythm guitar (2011–2014)

Touring musicians

- Nick Maybury – guitar, backing vocals (2014–present)
- Chris Joyner – keyboards, backing vocals (2014–present)
- Grant Fitzpatrick – bass, backing vocals (2014–present)
- Carl Carter – drums, percussion (2014–present)

== Discography ==
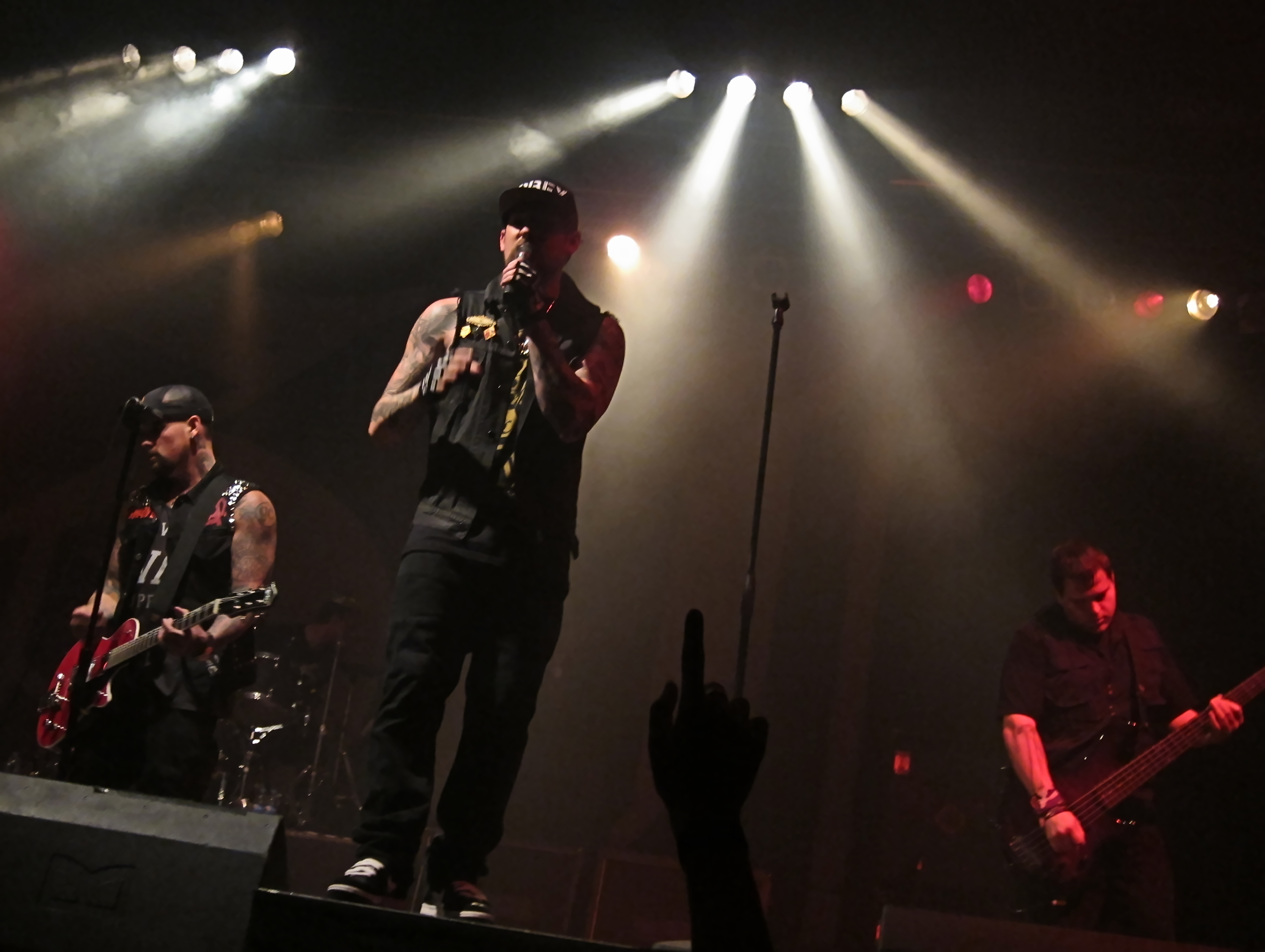
The Madden Brothers performing as Good Charlotte in Berlin, August 2011.

=== Studio albums ===
Title	Album details	Peak chart positions		Certifications
Title	Album details	AUS	NZ	Certifications
Greetings from California	Released: September 16, 2014 (US); Label: Capitol; Format: CD, LP, digital download	1	2	

=== Mixtapes ===
Title	Album details
Before – Volume One	Released: November 11, 2011; Label: LosMaddens; Format: Digital download

=== Singles ===
Title	Year	Peak chart positions		Certifications	Album
Title	Year	AUS	NZ	Certifications	Album
"Let the World Be Still"	2012	—	—		Non-album single
"We Are Done"	2014	1	1	ARIA: 2× Platinum; RMNZ: Platinum	Greetings from California
"Dear Jane"	2014	57	—		Greetings from California
"—" denotes a recording that did not chart or was not released in that territory.
