= Nickelodeon Australian Kids' Choice Awards 2009 =

2009 Australian award ceremony

2009 Nickelodeon Australian Kids' Choice Awards
- Date: 13 November 2009
- Location: Hisense Arena
- Hosted by: Delta Goodrem, with co-hosts Benji Madden and Joel Madden

Television/radio coverage
- Network: Nickelodeon

The 7th annual Australian Nickelodeon Kids' Choice Awards was held on 13 November 2009 at the Hisense Arena in Melbourne and was broadcast as LIVE in Australia at 7.00pm on Nickelodeon (Foxtel and Austar). The nominees for 2009 were announced on 20 September 2009.

There were performances by Australian artists, Guy Sebastian, Jessica Mauboy, Cassie Davis and Short Stack. The hosts of the night were, Australian singer Delta Goodrem, along with international co-hosts, Benji Madden and Joel Madden from Good Charlotte. Miranda Cosgrove from hit Nickelodeon show iCarly was a special guest. An Australian magazine reported that Twilight stars Robert Pattinson and Kristen Stewart would also be attending, but this rumour has now been debunked due to the timing of the New Moon release in the U.S.

== Guests ==
Slipknot

- Good Charlotte
- Miranda Cosgrove
- Joel Madden
- Benji Madden
- Delta Goodrem
- Guy Sebastian
- Jessica Mauboy
- Indiana Evans
- Cassie Davis
- Adam Copeland
- Eve Torres
- Faria Putal
- Short Stack
- Bindi Irwin
- Robert Irwin
- Vanessa Amorosi
- Josh Thomas
- Sam Clark
- Kyle Linahan
- Rachael Finch
- Cassie Davis
- Angus McLaren
- Margot Robbie
- Peter Helliar
- Ed Kavalee
- Nat Wolff
- Alex Wolff
- Cariba Heine
- Ruby Rose
- Shaun Micallef
- Dean Geyer
- Andrew G
- James Sorensen
- Poh Ling Yeow
- Julie Goodwin
- Luke and Wyatt
- Dash and Will
- Nacho Pop

== Performers ==
- Guy Sebastian
- Jessica Mauboy
- Cassie Davis
- Delta Goodrem
- Benji Madden and Joel Madden

== Nominees ==
=== Music ===
==== Fave Aussie Singer ====
- Jessica Mauboy
- Cassie Davis
- Natalie Bassingthwaighte
- Wes Carr

==== Fave Aussie Band ====
- Short Stack
- The Veronicas
- AC/DC
- Kisschasy

==== Fave Song ====
- I Gotta Feeling – Black Eyed Peas
- Love Story – Taylor Swift
- Paranoid – The Jonas Brothers
- Sway, Sway Baby! – Short Stack

==== Fave International Band ====
- Black Eyed Peas
- Fall Out Boy
- The Jonas Brothers
- The Naked Brothers Band

==== Fave International Singer ====
- Pink
- Demi Lovato
- Miley Cyrus
- Taylor Swift

=== Movies ===
==== Fave Movie ====
- 17 Again
- Bolt
- Ice Age 3
- Twilight

==== Fave Movie Star ====
- Daniel Radcliffe
- Robert Pattinson
- Joe Jonas
- Zac Efron

=== TV ===
==== Fave Comedy Show ====
- Drake and Josh
- iCarly
- Sonny With a Chance
- Talkin' 'Bout Your Generation

==== Fave Drama Show ====
- Blue Water High
- Neighbours
- H_{2}O: Just Add Water
- Home and Away

==== Fave International TV Star ====
- Drake Bell
- Miley Cyrus
- Miranda Cosgrove
- Selena Gomez

==== Fave Reality TV Show ====
- Australian Idol
- Camp Orange
- Master Chef Australia
- So You Think You Can Dance Australia

==== Fave TV Star ====
- Andrew G
- Natalie Bassingthwaighte
- Rove McManus
- Shaun Micallef

==== Fave Toon ====
- SpongeBob SquarePants
- Phineas and Ferb
- Avatar: The Last Airbender
- The Simpsons

=== Hotties ===
==== Fave Sports Stars ====
- David Beckham
- Libby Trickett
- Michael Clarke
- Stephanie Rice

==== Fave Aussie ====
- Bindi Irwin
- Hugh Jackman
- Rove McManus
- Jessica Mauboy

==== Fave Aussie Hottie ====
- Dean Geyer
- Margot Robbie
- Miranda Kerr
- Shaun Diviney

==== So Hot Right Now ====
- Miranda Cosgrove
- Jessica Mauboy
- Guy Sebastian

=== Biggest Greenie ===
- Bindi & Robert Irwin
