= Dear Jane (song) =

Single by The Madden Brothers

from the album Greetings from California
- Released: September 3, 2014
- Recorded: 2013
- Genre: Pop rock; alternative rock
- Length: 3:38
- Label: Capitol
- Songwriters: Benji Madden; Joel Madden

The Madden Brothers singles chronology
"We Are Done" (2014)	"Dear Jane" (2014)

"Dear Jane" is a song written by Benji Madden and Joel Madden for The Madden Brothers' first studio album Greetings from California. It was released as a single on September 3, 2014.

== Lyric video ==
A lyric video for "Dear Jane" appeared on Vevo on September 3, 2014. It was sponsored by the Honda Civic Tour for the Honda Stage.

== Charts ==
Chart (2014)	Peak position
Australia (ARIA)	57
