= I Just Wanna Live =

2005 single by Good Charlotte

Single by Good Charlotte

from the album The Chronicles of Life and Death
- B-side: "S.O.S." (live from Sessions@AOL)
- Released: January 17, 2005
- Length: 2:46
- Label: Epic; Daylight
- Songwriters: Benji Madden; Joel Madden; John Feldmann
- Producer: Eric Valentine

Good Charlotte singles chronology
"Predictable" (2004)	"I Just Wanna Live" (2005)	"The Chronicles of Life and Death" (2005)

Music video
- "I Just Wanna Live" on YouTube

"I Just Wanna Live" is the second single from American rock band Good Charlotte's third studio album, The Chronicles of Life and Death. Officially released on January 17, 2005, "I Just Wanna Live" was one of the songs that Sony paid radio stations to play in the 2005 payola scandal. Commercially, the song was certified gold in Australia and the United States, and it became their highest-charting song in Austria, Germany, and New Zealand.

== Music video ==
The music video for "I Just Wanna Live" was directed by Brett Simon. The video opens with Good Charlotte performing in front of an unenthused and small crowd at a bar in Baltimore. Down on their luck and in need of funds, the band quit performing to work at a supermarket handing out flyers while dressed in various foods, only to find similar success. While dejectedly eating lunch on the side of the road, a record executive in a limousine passes by and, seeing a way to make a fortune from the group, signs them into his label. Now calling themselves The Food Group, their debut album, All U Can Eat, becomes a success and rockets the band to national and international stardom, especially among women in the young adult and teen range.

As the band continues to enjoy rising popularity and a life of debauchery, they start getting wrapped up in a myriad of scandals that diminish their popularity: Benji Madden (Corn) is arrested after getting involved in a high-speed chase with the police. Billy Martin (Strawberry) and Chris Wilson (Carrot) indiscriminately assault a paparazzi member. Paul Thomas (Burger) makes a sexually suggestive move with an underage girl dressed as an ice cream cone, leading to a ban of The Food Group by the PTA. Joel Madden (Pizza) is caught up in a lip-sync mishap while performing live, which he blames on his indigestion. With The Food Group's reputation tarnished and their former fans now against them following the scandals, the band eventually discards their food suits and return to performing as a little-known rock band.

== Track listings ==
UK CD1

1. "I Just Wanna Live" – 2:46
2. "Mountain" (live from Sessions@AOL) – 3:53

UK CD2 and Australian CD single

1. "I Just Wanna Live" – 2:46
2. "S.O.S." (live from Sessions@AOL) – 3:28
3. "The World Is Black" (live from Sessions@AOL) – 3:10
4. "I Just Wanna Live" (video) – 2:46

UK 7-inch picture disc

A. "I Just Wanna Live" – 2:46
B. "S.O.S." (live from Sessions@AOL) – 3:28

== Charts ==
=== Weekly charts ===
Chart (2005)	Peak position
Australia (ARIA)	12
Austria (Ö3 Austria Top 40)	15
Canada CHR/Pop Top 30 (Radio & Records)	11
Canada Hot AC Top 30 (Radio & Records)	27
Czech Republic (IFPI)	32
Europe (Eurochart Hot 100)	18
Germany (GfK)	19
Greece (IFPI)	20
Hungary (Editors' Choice Top 40)	24
Ireland (IRMA)	15
Italy (FIMI)	9
Netherlands (Dutch Top 40)	9
Netherlands (Single Top 100)	23
New Zealand (Recorded Music NZ)	6
Scotland Singles (OCC)	9
Sweden (Sverigetopplistan)	27
Switzerland (Schweizer Hitparade)	21
UK Singles (OCC)	9
UK Rock & Metal (OCC)	1
US Billboard Hot 100	51
US Pop Airplay (Billboard)	18

=== Year-end charts ===
Chart (2005)	Position
Australia (ARIA)	52
Italy (FIMI)	48
Netherlands (Dutch Top 40)	76
US Mainstream Top 40 (Billboard)	86
Venezuela (Record Report)	50

== Certifications ==
Region	Certification	Certified units/sales
Australia (ARIA)	Gold	35,000^{^}
United States (RIAA)	Gold	500,000^{*}
^{*} Sales figures based on certification alone.^{^} Shipments figures based on certification alone.

== Release history ==
Region	Date	Format(s)	Label(s)	Ref.
Australia	January 17, 2005	CD	Epic; Daylight	
Denmark	January 24, 2005	CD	Epic; Daylight	
United Kingdom	January 31, 2005	CD; DVD	Epic; Daylight	
