= The Chronicles of Life and Death =

- "Life" version. The "Death" cover art uses the same book cover art, but shows considerable wear.

Studio album by Good Charlotte
- Released: October 5, 2004
- Recorded: March – June 2004
- Studios: Barefoot Studios (Hollywood, Los Angeles, California)
- Genre: Pop-punk
- Length: 51:26
- Labels: Epic; Daylight
- Producer: Eric Valentine

Good Charlotte chronology
The Young and the Hopeless (2002)	The Chronicles of Life and Death (2004)	Good Morning Revival (2007)

Singles from The Chronicles of Life and Death
- 1. "Predictable" Released: September 27, 2004; 2. "I Just Wanna Live" Released: January 17, 2005; 3. "The Chronicles of Life and Death" Released: June 3, 2005; 4. "We Believe" Released: August 15, 2005

The Chronicles of Life and Death is the third album by the American rock band Good Charlotte. Following the release of The Young and the Hopeless (2002), the group spent two years touring. By the second half of 2003, they had begun writing for the next album. With producer Eric Valentine, the band recorded at Barefoot Studios in Hollywood, California, between March and June 2004. Over half of the album's material was written by Benji and Joel Madden, with the remainder being co-written with Valentine, Goldfinger frontman John Feldmann or guitarist Billy Martin. Preceded by the single release of "Predictable", The Chronicles of Life and Death was released through Epic and Daylight Records on October 5, 2004. Two variations were made available: "Life" and "Death" versions which came with different cover artwork (designed by Martin) and a different bonus track.

Drummer Chris Wilson was in therapy and sat out the initial promotional appearances around the album's release; Alkaline Trio drummer Derek Grant filled in for him temporarily during the group's co-headlining US tour with Sum 41. In early 2005, "I Just Wanna Live" was released as a single and tours of Japan, New Zealand, Australia and Europe followed. The band co-headlined the Noise to the World Tour with Simple Plan in May and June, which coincided with the single release of the album's title-track. Wilson left the group a few shows into the trek, and was replaced by Dean Butterworth. "We Believe" was released as a single in August, which coincided with a series of European festival appearances.

The Chronicles of Life and Death received a generally mixed reception from music critics with some finding the lyrics lacking depth and others praising the instrumentation and darker tone. Nevertheless, the record sold 199,000 copies in its first week and debuted at number three on the Billboard 200, the band's highest debut on the chart. It was eventually certified platinum, and as of February 2007, sales stood at 1.1 million copies. The album was also successful outside of the US. It charted at number one in Australia, reached the top 10 in Canada, Japan and the UK, as well as the top 20 in Austria, New Zealand, Sweden, Italy and Switzerland. Within these territories, the album was certified platinum in Australia, and gold in Austria, Germany and the UK. "Predictable" and "I Just Wanna Live" appeared on US radio charts and reached the top 40 in Australia, New Zealand, the Netherlands, and the UK.

== Background and production ==
Good Charlotte released their second album, The Young and the Hopeless, in October 2002. Three of the album's singles—"Lifestyles of the Rich & Famous", "Girls & Boys", and "The Anthem"—shifted the group from modern rock to mainstream top 40 radio. As a result, The Young and the Hopeless debuted in the top 10 on the Billboard 200 chart, having sold 117,000 copies in its first week of release. It eventually sold over three million copies in the US. Following its release, the band spent the next two years touring, which included two US arena tours. In August 2003, the group began assembling songs for their next album. They planned to write while on tour between September and November, and were expected to start recording after it ended.

In January 2004, the group embarked on a tour of Japan. Their label Epic/Daylight Records told the band they would be going into the studio to record shortly after the tour ended. On hearing this, vocalist Joel Madden was unsure what to write about saying, "We were just in this whirlwind bubble." He flew back to the US and travelled from his home in San Francisco to Los Angeles. Recording for their next album took place at Barefoot Studios in Hollywood, California. Eric Valentine was the producer and engineer assisted by Trevor Whatever and Chris Roach.

The group entered the studio with 16–18 songs. Recording sessions began in March and ended in June. Matt Radosevich handled the editing, programming, additional engineering and played piano on "The Truth". The strings conduction and arrangements were done by David Campbell, along with Valentine on the latter composition. Michele Ito and Chikako Horii sang on "Once Upon a Time: The Battle of Life and Death". John Feldmann tracked additional guitars for "I Just Wanna Live". Valentine mixed and mastered the recordings, except for "Meet My Maker", which was mixed by Jacquire King with assistance from Andy Hunt.

== Composition ==
The group faced "a lot of criticism from all sides" and felt out of place in the current pop scene and the pop-punk genre they had come from. The band's members internalised this while they made the album; Joel Madden said they were "ready to move on and make a statement", wanting to do "something grand". Their label wanted a more marketable release, however, the band rebelled by going in a dark and moody direction with some sarcastic moments on "I Just Wanna Live". With a lot of pressure to come up with another hit single, the band opted to go as dark as they could. The resulting album was "a cohesive record" that dealt with the members' thoughts about their "own mortality in the emotional, physical and musical sense". A conscious effort was made to focus on mortality, as well as life and death; hope serves as recurring theme throughout the album. Musically, the album has been classified as pop-punk, with elements of British punk rock, emo, arena rock, goth rock, hip-hop, new wave and rock opera.

Michael Odell of Blender described The Chronicles of Life and Death as a concept album that "span[s] the outer reaches of [Good Charlotte's] topsy-turvy philosophical world". Half of the album was written by Benji and Joel Madden, while they co-wrote the remaining tracks with Valentine, Feldmann or guitarist Billy Martin. Piano and string instruments appear throughout the album. The opening track "Once Upon a Time: The Battle of Life and Death" is an instrumental featuring strings and a Japanese choir. The track, along with the ending of "In This World (Murder)", represents the cycle of life and death. The title track opens with the beeping sound of a heart-rate monitor before Joel Madden's vocal begins over a power pop groove in the style of the Kinks. "Walk Away (Maybe)" fuses hard rock-edged verses with indie rock-esque strumming patterns. The rock track "S.O.S." is a suicide note portraying drama.

The dance-rock track "I Just Wanna Live", the album's biggest musical departure from the band's usual style, combines power chords, string samples and disco beats, with Madden rapping over it in the vein of Nelly. The lyrics talk about celebrity life, refencing "Lifestyles of the Rich & Famous" in the process. The new wave "Ghost of You" features synthesizers and strings, and is reminiscent of New Order. "Predictable" starts off with strings before shifting into a spoken-word rant by Madden. "Secrets" comes across as sounding like a Morrissey and Jerry Finn collaboration. The piano ballad "The Truth" is followed by the keyboard and acoustic-driven "The World Is Black", which was compared to the Cure's sound. Madden said "We Believe" sounded like a track that could be sung by Elton John or Billy Joel. He wrote it while watching CNN and was singing about things what were happening in the world. Hidden track "Wounded" is an acoustic track.

== Release ==
On August 9 and 10, 2004, the group filmed a video for "Predictable" in Toronto, Canada. Martin said it shows two sides of the group: "There's a dark, twisted room where we're playing in, where it's thunderstorming... [and then] Joel [Madden] goes outside and the sky is perfectly clear and it's like a nice neighborhood". "Predictable" was released to radio on August 24. A behind-the-scenes making-of the song video premiered in early September. "Predictable" was released as a CD single in Australia on September 27 with an acoustic version of "The Chronicles of Life and Death", and live versions of "The Anthem" and "Hold On" recorded at Abbey Road Studios as B-sides.

The Chronicles of Life and Death was made available for streaming on October 1 through MTV's The Leak. Initially planned for release in September, the album was released on October 5 through Epic and Daylight Records in two different editions: Life (with "Falling Away" as a bonus track) and Death (with "Meet My Maker" as a bonus track), both with different artwork created by Martin. The Target Life edition included a live session version of "The Anthem" as a bonus track. Some independent stores were annoyed at this gimmick and pulled stock for all Epic releases for the two weeks. The Japanese edition featured both "Falling Away" and "Meet My Maker" and a Japanese version of "Predictable" as bonus tracks. The art for the Life version resembles a new book, while the art for the Death version resembles a 100-year-old book. The album booklet is designed in the style of a storybook with the song lyrics telling a story accompanied by illustrations.

A music video for "I Just Wanna Live" premiered on Total Request Live on November 16, 2004. Directed by Brett Simon, it features the group performing in a dive bar before the band members return to their day jobs. Eventually, someone from the music industry signs the band, known as the Food Group, who are dressed as different food items. They become the center of attention due a sex tape controversy and a lip-synching disaster. A behind-the-scenes video was released on December 18. "I Just Wanna Live" was released as a CD single in Australia on January 17, 2005, with live versions of "S.O.S." and "The World Is Black" as B-sides.

In early April 2005, a music video was filmed for "We Believe" with director Sam Erickson at the Orpheum Theatre in Los Angeles, California. The video features the group in an abandoned theatre performing in front of a movie screen showing images of war and people suffering. "The Chronicles of Life and Death" was released as a CD single in Australia on June 3 and in the UK on June 7 with live versions of "The Chronicles of Life and Death" and "Mountain", and a remix of "I Just Wanna Live" as B-sides. "We Believe" was released as a single on August 15. On November 13, the album was released on the DualDisc format. It included a making-of documentary and live performances. In September 2010, the album was reissued as a two-CD package with Good Morning Revival.

== Touring ==
In June 2004, the group was due to perform a few shows on the Warped Tour, but these appearances were cancelled and rescheduled in August. During this time, the band headlined Edgefest. Several TV appearances across Europe followed in late September and early October, leading to a performance at AOL Music Live in New York in the same year. During this show, they debuted material from their forthcoming album with Alkaline Trio drummer Derek Grant temporarily substituting for the band's Chris Wilson who was undergoing therapy. Grant played with the group for a few more promotional events including an appearance on Late Night with Conan O'Brien and in-store performances. In October and November, the group went on a co-headlining US tour with Sum 41. They were supported by Lola Ray and Hazen Street.

In February 2005, the band toured Japan, New Zealand and Australia. Later that month, they performed on The Tonight Show with Jay Leno and at MTV's TRL Awards, and appeared at MTV Asia's tsunami relief event. The group embarked on European and the UK tour in March with support from the Explosion and Millencolin. In May and June, the group went on a co-headlining US tour with Simple Plan, dubbed the Noise to the World tour. They were supported by Reliant K. A few dates into the tour, Wilson left the group citing health concerns. He was replaced by Dean Butterworth, who had been introduced to the group by fellow musician John Feldmann. In between dates on this tour, the band headlined a number of shows before going on a tour of Asia in July. The Canadian leg of the Noise to the World tour followed later in July followed by a series of European festivals in August. In October, the band appeared at the Bridge School Benefit and played a few shows in South America in November and December.

== Reception ==
Professional ratings
Aggregate scores
Source	Rating
Metacritic	53/100
Review scores
Source	Rating
AllMusic	3.5/5 stars
Blender	3/5 stars
E!	B
Entertainment Weekly	B+
The Guardian	2/5 stars
NME	0/10
Q	2/5 stars
Rolling Stone	2/5 stars
Stylus	B−
The Village Voice	C+

=== Critical response ===
The Chronicles of Life and Death has received generally mixed reviews, according to review aggregator Metacritic. AllMusic reviewer Johnny Loftus said Madden's "newly developed husky tenor" aids him on the collection's "more introspective" tracks, while he manages to "still belt out the rousing punk-pop choruses" on a few tracks. Billboard writer Keith Caulfield felt the group "takes its proven peppy rock sound to new heights." Michael Endelman of Entertainment Weekly called the record a "giant leap forward" in terms of "instrumental prowess, and in emotional and melodic scope." E! Online also gave it a positive review, saying: "Pulling off the tricky balancing act of aiming for mainstream success while keeping one's street cred intact, songs like 'Ghost of You' and 'Predictable' abandon the band's mall-rat roots in exchange for more mature influences like U2 and Muse." Stylus Magazine contributor Anthony Miccio called the lyricism "near-perfect" with "blessedly literal expressions of emotion and identity" conveyed by the "unabashed and outrageously catchy songcraft."

Spin writer Joe Gross said the group stretched the feeling of "Hold On" (from The Young and the Hopeless) and applied it across the entirety of Chronicles, "reducing the band's wide-eyed sadness to overpolished moping." Elizabeth Bromstein of Now viewed the lyrics as "average" and Madden's voice as "still sound[ing] whiny". Jason Heller for Riverfront Times said the band "dressing up its stale pop-punk with strings and reverb is like pouring Magic Shell over a dog turd." IGN's JR bluntly called listening to the album "the most painful thing in the world." The New York Times gave the album a negative review, saying it was "full of ham-fisted ideas." Betty Clarke of The Guardian wrote that the band "delve[s] deeper into their tortured psyche while striving to be taken seriously" as pop punk "rhythms crash into string sections, empathy clashes with loathing." NME also gave a negative review, saying: "Half the time, Good Charlotte sound like Blink-182 after the snip, the other half they sound like the Backstreet Boys without the songs." Q found it "nothing if not ambitious", while lacking "the depth, or the authority, to pull it off." On the other hand, Rolling Stone writer Jenny Eliscu said the group's "usual problem" was their "asinine lyrics." The Village Voice said that "[b]eyond some rich-and-famous irony, not a single suburban detail soils an hour of good intentions. And you know the music overreaches too."

=== Commercial performance and legacy ===
The Chronicles of Life and Death debuted at number three on the Billboard 200 after selling 199,000 copies in its first week of release. As of February 2007, it had sold 1.1 million copies in the US and has been certified platinum. The album reached number 171 and 117 on the Billboard 200 year-end charts in 2004 and 2005, respectively. Outside of the US, the album charted at: number one in Australia, number two in Canada, number six in Japan, number eight in the UK, number 11 in Austria and New Zealand, number 13 in Sweden, number 20 in Italy and Switzerland. It was certified gold in Austria, Germany and the UK, and platinum in Australia.

"Predictable" charted in the US at number six on the Bubbling Under Hot 100, number 20 on the Mainstream Top 40, and number 28 on the Alternative Songs. Outside of the US, it charted at number 12 in the UK, number 15 in Australia, number 27 in New Zealand, and number 39 in the Netherlands. "I Just Wanna Live" charted in the US at number 51 on the Billboard Hot 100 chart and number 18 on the Mainstream Top 40. Outside of the US, it charted at: number six in New Zealand, number nine in the UK, number 12 in Australia, number 15 in Austria, number 21 in Switzerland, and number 23 in the Netherlands. It was certified gold in the US and Australia. "The Chronicles of Life and Death" charted at: number 27 in Sweden, number 30 in the UK, number 31 in Australia, number 47 in Switzerland, and number 50 in Austria. "We Believe" charted at number 39 in Austria, and number 99 in the Netherlands.

"I Just Wanna Live" was one of the songs that Sony BMG, Epic's parent company, paid radio stations to play in the 2005 payola scandal. Two tracks were remixed for inclusion on the band's Greatest Remixes (2008) compilation: "I Just Wanna Live" (by Teddy Riley) and "Predictable" (by Stress the Whiteboy featuring Rahzii Hi-Power). "Predictable", "I Just Wanna Live", "The Chronicles of Life and Death" and "We Believe" were included on the band's Greatest Hits (2010) compilation. In 2016, Benji Madden said of the album: "We were showing our depth. We didn't want any rules, we didn't want any boundaries ... We wanted to do the things that we wanted to do." The following year, Joel Madden added: "'Chronicles' was us putting something above the success and it cemented us as the band who will always go left when you want us to go right."

Over time, the album has been recognized for its boldness and the band's effort to mature their sound. WhatCulture ranked it among Good Charlotte's top albums, noting it as "the first time the band stepped away from their 'norm' and rebelled."

== Track listing ==
All songs written by Benji and Joel Madden, except where noted.

No.	Title	Length
1.	"Once Upon a Time: The Battle of Life and Death" (B. Madden, Eric Valentine)	2:24
2.	"The Chronicles of Life and Death"	3:03
3.	"Walk Away (Maybe)"	3:20
4.	"S.O.S."	3:42
5.	"I Just Wanna Live" (B. Madden, J. Madden, John Feldmann)	2:46
6.	"Ghost of You" (B. Madden, J. Madden, Billy Martin)	4:50
7.	"Predictable"	3:11
8.	"Secrets"	3:53
9.	"The Truth" (B. Madden, J. Madden, Feldmann)	3:56
10.	"The World Is Black"	3:06
11.	"Mountain" (B. Madden, J. Madden, Martin)	4:33
12.	"We Believe"	3:51
13.	"It Wasn't Enough" (B. Madden, J. Madden, Feldmann)	3:24
14.	"In This World (Murder)" (30 seconds of silence at end of track)	5:27
Total length:		51:26

Life version bonus track
No.	Title	Length
15.	"Falling Away" (with hidden track "Wounded")	8:06
Total length:		59:31

Target life version bonus track
No.	Title	Length
16.	"The Anthem" (live from the Abbey Road Sessions; with hidden track "Wounded")	8:48

Death version bonus track
No.	Title	Length
15.	"Meet My Maker" (with hidden track "Wounded")	8:39
Total length:		60:03

Japanese version bonus tracks
No.	Title	Length
15.	"Falling Away"	3:05
16.	"Meet My Maker"	3:38
17.	"Predictable" (Japanese version; with hidden track "Wounded")	8:08
Total length:		64:28

== Personnel ==
Personnel per booklet.

Good Charlotte

- Benji Madden – guitars, vocals
- Joel Madden – vocals
- Paul Thomas – bass
- Billy Martin – guitars, keyboards
- Chris Wilson – drums

Additional musicians

- David Campbell – string conducting, string arrangement
- Eric Valentine – string arrangement
- Matt Radosevich – piano (track 9)
- Michele Ito – vocals, translation (track 1)
- Chikako Horii – vocals, translation (track 1)
- John Feldmann – additional guitars (track 2)

Production

- Eric Valentine – producer, engineer, mixing, mastering
- Jacquire King – mixing ("Meet My Maker")
- Andy Hunt – mixing assistant
- Matt Radosevich – editing, programming, additional engineering
- Trevor Whatever – studio assistant
- Chris Roach – studio assistant
- Stephen Jarvis – equipment guru
- Billy Martin – drawings, concept
- Domestic Dan – coloration, design

== Charts and certifications ==
=== Weekly charts ===
Weekly chart performance for The Chronicles of Life and Death
Chart (2004–2005)	Peak position
Australian Albums (ARIA)	1
Austrian Albums (Ö3 Austria)	11
Canadian Albums (Billboard)	2
Finnish Albums (Suomen virallinen lista)	34
French Albums (SNEP)	32
Italian Albums (FIMI)	20
Japanese Albums (Oricon)	6
New Zealand Albums (RMNZ)	11
Swedish Albums (Sverigetopplistan)	13
Swiss Albums (Schweizer Hitparade)	20
UK Albums (Official Charts)	8
US Billboard 200	3

=== Year-end charts ===
2004 year-end chart performance for The Chronicles of Life and Death
Chart (2004)	Position
Australian Albums (ARIA)	75
US Billboard 200	171

2005 year-end chart performance for The Chronicles of Life and Death
Chart (2005)	Position
Australian Albums (ARIA)	60
Austrian Albums (Ö3 Austria)	73
German Albums (Offizielle Top 100)	88
US Billboard 200	117

== Certifications ==
Certifications and sales for The Chronicles of Life and Death
Region	Certification	Certified units/sales
Australia (ARIA)	Platinum	70,000^{^}
Austria (IFPI Austria)	Gold	15,000^{*}
Germany (BVMI)	Gold	100,000^{^}
Japan (RIAJ)	Gold	100,000^{^}
New Zealand (RMNZ)	Gold	7,500^{^}
United Kingdom (BPI)	Gold	100,000^{^}
United States (RIAA)	Platinum	1,000,000^{^}
^{*} Sales figures based on certification alone.^{^} Shipments figures based on certification alone.
