= We Are Done =

Single by The Madden Brothers

from the album Greetings from California
- Released: May 30, 2014
- Recorded: 2013
- Genre: Pop rock; alternative rock
- Length: 3:36
- Label: Capitol
- Songwriters: Benji Madden; Joel Madden
- Producer: Eric Valentine

The Madden Brothers singles chronology
"We Are Done" (2014)	"Dear Jane" (2014)

"We Are Done" is a song written by Eric Valentine for The Madden Brothers' first studio album Greetings from California. The song premiered on May 30, 2014, on 102.7 KIIS FM. Two music videos were filmed for the song. "We Are Done" was released to mainstream radio on July 1, 2014.

This song was very successful particularly in the Oceania region, where it topped the singles charts in Australia and New Zealand. It is also featured on the FIFA 15 soundtrack and Guitar Hero Live.

== Track listing ==
- Digital download
1. "We Are Done" – 3:36

== Charts ==
=== Weekly charts ===
Chart (2014)	Peak position
Australia (ARIA)	1
New Zealand (Recorded Music NZ)	1
US Hot Rock & Alternative Songs (Billboard)	23
US Adult Pop Airplay (Billboard)	35
US Pop Airplay (Billboard)	29

=== Year-end charts ===
Chart (2014)	Position
Australia (ARIA)	24
New Zealand (Recorded Music NZ)	9

== Certifications ==
Region	Certification	Certified units/sales
Australia (ARIA)	3× Platinum	210,000^{^}
New Zealand (RMNZ)	Platinum	15,000^{*}
^{*} Sales figures based on certification alone.^{^} Shipments figures based on certification alone.

== Release history ==
Country	Date	Format	Label
Australia	2 June 2014	Digital download	Capitol
New Zealand	2 June 2014	Digital download	Capitol
United States	2 June 2014	Digital download	Capitol
United States	1 July 2014	Mainstream airplay	Capitol
