= Girls & Boys (Good Charlotte song) =

2003 single by Good Charlotte

Single by Good Charlotte

from the album The Young and the Hopeless
- Released: April 28, 2003
- Genre: Pop-punk
- Length: 3:01
- Label: Epic; Daylight
- Songwriters: Benji Madden; Joel Madden
- Producer: Eric Valentine

Good Charlotte singles chronology
"The Anthem" (2003)	"Girls & Boys" (2003)	"The Young & the Hopeless" (2003)

Music video
- "Girls & Boys" on YouTube

"Girls & Boys" is the third single taken from American rock band Good Charlotte's second studio album, The Young and the Hopeless (2002). The song was released in Europe on April 28, 2003, and was issued in the United States and Australia later in the year. "Girls & Boys" peaked at number 48 on the US Billboard Hot 100 and peaked at number six in the United Kingdom, receiving a silver certification from the British Phonographic Industry (BPI) in 2018 for sales and streaming units exceeding 200,000. Elsewhere, the single reached the top 40 in Australia, Ireland, and New Zealand.

== Music video ==
Principal photography for the "Girls & Boys" video took place in the suburb of Ellerslie in Auckland, New Zealand predominantly featuring geriatric people dressed and acting like stereotypical hardcore punk youths for comedic effect. The various members of the band are shown interacting with the older characters (for example Billy Martin and Paul Thomas playing video games, Benji Madden giving massages and Joel Madden doing a dance number with woman in tracksuits. At the end of the video, Benji Madden wakes up to find an old woman wearing one of his shirts and offering him a bowl of cereal, but the official YouTube edit omits this scene, with another omitted mid-video scene of dialogue with a senior woman walks up to the band sitting on the curb asking what they would like to do and then proposing they "trash the mall", a parodying reference to Avril Lavigne's 2002 video "Complicated".

== Track listings ==
UK CD1

1. "Girls & Boys" – 3:01
2. "Riot Girl" (acoustic) – 2:22
3. "Girls & Boys" (video) – 3:01

UK CD2

1. "Girls & Boys"
2. "Lifestyles of the Rich and Famous" (live acoustic)
3. "The Young and the Hopeless" (acoustic)

European CD single

1. "Girls & Boys"
2. "Riot Girl" (acoustic version)

Australian CD single

1. "Girls & Boys"
2. "If You Leave"
3. "The Motivation Proclamation" (recorded live at Channel V)
4. "Complicated"

== Charts ==
=== Weekly charts ===
Chart (2003)	Peak position
Australia (ARIA)	33
Austria (Ö3 Austria Top 40)	45
Europe (Eurochart Hot 100)	20
Germany (GfK)	47
Ireland (IRMA)	36
New Zealand (Recorded Music NZ)	25
Romania (Romanian Top 100)	68
Scotland Singles (Official Charts)	5
Sweden (Sverigetopplistan)	44
Switzerland (Schweizer Hitparade)	84
UK Singles (Official Charts)	6
UK Rock & Metal (Official Charts)	1
US Billboard Hot 100	48
US Pop Airplay (Billboard)	10

=== Year-end charts ===
Chart (2003)	Position
UK Singles (OCC)	122
US Mainstream Top 40 (Billboard)	61

== Certifications ==
Region	Certification	Certified units/sales
New Zealand (RMNZ)	Gold	15,000^{‡}
United Kingdom (BPI)	Silver	200,000^{‡}
United States (RIAA)	Gold	500,000^{‡}
^{‡} Sales+streaming figures based on certification alone.

== Release history ==
Region	Date	Format(s)	Label(s)	Ref.
Europe	April 28, 2003	CD	Epic; Daylight	
United Kingdom	May 5, 2003	CD; cassette	Epic; Daylight	
Denmark	May 26, 2003	CD	Epic; Daylight	
Australia	July 7, 2003	CD	Epic; Daylight	
