= Bradley Williams =

Bradley Williams may refer to:

- Bradley Williams (cricketer)
- Bradley Williams (footballer) (born 2004), English professional footballer

== See also ==
- Brad Williams (disambiguation)
