= Goldmine (magazine) =

American magazine for music collecting

- Categories: Music, collectables
- Frequency: Bi-monthly
- First issue: September 1974
- Country: United States
- Based in: New York City, U.S.
- Language: English
- Website: goldminemag.com
- ISSN: 1055-2685

Goldmine, established in September 1974 by Brian Bukantis in Fraser, Michigan, is an American magazine that focuses on the collectors' market for records, tapes, CDs, and music-related memorabilia. Each issue features news articles, interviews, discographies, histories, current reviews on recording stars of the past and present. Discographies are included, listing all known releases. Coverage includes rock, blues, soul, Americana, folk, new wave, punk and heavy metal. As of 2026, the publication is owned by Veeps, a subsidiary of Live Nation.

== History ==
Goldmine was published bimonthly until 1977, when it became a monthly publication. It returned to a bimonthly frequency at the beginning of 2022. Its headquarters is in New York, NY. It has been edited by Patrick Prince since 2015, and was earlier edited by Prince from 2010 to 2012. Its writers have included Dave Thompson, Harvey Kubernik, Jeff Tamarkin (who served as editor from 1981-96), Colin Escott, Gillian G. Gaar, David Nathan, Steve Roeser, Jay Jay French, Cub Koda, and Debbie Kruger. The magazine was produced on newsprint in a tabloid format.

Nearly all of the publication's staff were laid off in August 2026.
