= Veeps =

American livestreaming and entertainment company

- Type: Private
- Industry: Entertainment
- Founded: 2017
- Founders: Joel Madden, Benji Madden, Sherry Saeedi, Kyle Heller
- Headquarters: Los Angeles, California, United States
- Key people: Joel Madden (co-founder and CEO); Kyle Heller (co-founder and chief product officer)
- Services: Livestreaming, video on demand, ticketing, original programming, film production, music media
- Owner: Live Nation Entertainment (majority stake)
- Divisions: Veeps Studio
- Website: www.veeps.com

Veeps (stylized in all caps) is an American entertainment company based in Los Angeles, California. Founded in 2017 by brothers Joel Madden and Benji Madden of Good Charlotte, along with Sherry Saeedi and Kyle Heller, the company operates a livestreaming and on-demand entertainment platform focused on live music and other entertainment programming.

== History ==
=== Founding and early development ===
Veeps was founded in 2017 by Joel Madden and Benji Madden, along with Kyle Heller and Sherry Saeedi. The company grew out of the Maddens' work at MDDN, where Saeedi had joined the management team after working in artist management. MDDN lists Veeps among its brands, while Veeps operates as a separate entertainment company. Veeps was initially developed as a commission-free platform for artists to manage their VIP offerings, ticketing and direct relationships with fans, with the goal of giving artists greater control over this part of their touring businesses. The platform allowed artists to organize VIP experiences, sell tickets and communicate directly with fans without charging commissions. By early 2020, Veeps had more than 350 artists using the platform.

When the COVID-19 pandemic disrupted touring and live events, the company adapted its ticketing technology for livestreamed performances, allowing artists to sell virtual tickets and continue offering fan experiences online. The shift toward livestreaming rapidly expanded Veeps' audience and artist roster. In 2020, the platform hosted approximately 1,000 ticketed livestreams and generated more than $10 million for artists, their families, crews and charitable causes.

One of its largest early events was Louis Tomlinson's Live from London concert on December 12, 2020, which sold 160,000 tickets worldwide and established a Guinness World Records record for the most tickets sold for a livestreamed concert by a solo male artist.

=== Live Nation ownership and expansion ===
In January 2021, Live Nation Entertainment acquired a majority stake in Veeps for an undisclosed amount. The investment gave Veeps access to Live Nation's network of artists, venues and live events, while the company continued to operate under its existing leadership.

Following the investment, Veeps expanded its integration with Live Nation's physical concert venues. In 2021, the companies announced plans to equip more than 60 Live Nation venues in the United States with livestreaming technology, allowing artists performing at those venues to offer livestreams of their concerts.

Saeedi transitioned out of Veeps following the company's expansion and Live Nation's majority investment. In 2022, she founded Verswire, an artist-development and investment company, with Mark Hoppus and music manager Nick Lippman. Saeedi became Verswire's chief executive officer, while Hoppus served as a partner of A&R and Lippman as a partner.

Before the launch of its subscription service, Veeps primarily operated as a pay-per-view platform. In October 2023, Veeps launched Veeps All Access, a subscription video service backed by Live Nation Entertainment. The service offered access to live concerts, archived performances, artist exclusives and original programming.

The launch represented a shift toward a broader subscription-based video service built on Veeps' existing livestreaming infrastructure. The initial programming included concerts by artists such as The Postal Service, Death Cab for Cutie, Run the Jewels, as well as archived performances by artists including Aerosmith, Fall Out Boy, Katy Perry, and The Killers. The service also included original programs.

Veeps also entered partnerships with Samsung, Ticketmaster and Verizon and made All Access available through its applications for iPhone, Android, Apple TV and Roku. The service incorporated a show recommendation system, 4K video streaming and spatial audio capabilities. It initially launched in the United States, with international expansion planned.

In November 2023, Veeps expanded its programming beyond music by introducing a comedy vertical through a partnership with comedy label and production company 800 Pound Gorilla Media. The service offered stand-up specials from performers including Kyle Kinane, Tim Heidecker, Kelsey Cook, David Cross, Brad Williams, Sasheer Zamata and Hari Kondabolu. Bart Coleman served as head of comedy at Veeps, overseeing the development and curation of the comedy programming.

In 2026, Veeps expanded further into live sports and entertainment through a partnership with Major League Wrestling (MLW). The partnership introduced a free Saturday-night programming block featuring MLW wrestling programming, with the companies also planning quarterly premium live events.

=== Veeps Studio ===
In July 2024, Veeps launched Veeps Studio, a production division focused on producing "event cinema", including concert films and other entertainment projects for theatrical and digital distribution. Kyle Heller was appointed president of the studio, while Joel and Benji Madden served as executive producers. The studio's first announced project was Rite Here Rite Now, a concert and narrative film by Ghost. Veeps subsequently distributed the film globally through its streaming platform following its theatrical release.

Veeps Studio has subsequently been credited on productions including A Night at the Symphony: Hollywood Bowl, Improbably Poppy, Mary J. Blige: For My Fans — Live from Madison Square Garden, and Chase Atlantic: Lost in Heaven.

Veeps Studio also produces Artist Friendly, a music interview series hosted by Joel Madden. The series features conversations with musicians and other creators about their careers and creative experiences. After initially being released primarily as an audio podcast, the program expanded into video through its relationship with Veeps. In 2026, Artist Friendly with Joel Madden was named an honoree in the Best Video Series category at the Webby Awards, with Veeps listed as the entrant and Madden as its creator.

=== Media publications ===
Veeps expanded into music media through the acquisition of a group of publications previously owned by Project M Group. The portfolio included Alternative Press, BrooklynVegan, Revolver, and Goldmine.

In August 2026, Veeps restructured its music-publication operations, resulting in widespread layoffs affecting the four publications. The restructuring resulted in the loss of most editorial positions across the publications.
