= Alternative Press (magazine) =

American music magazine

- Cover of July 2013 issue of Alternative Press (#300), featuring My Chemical Romance
- Categories: Music
- Frequency: Quarterly
- Founder: Mike Shea
- Founded: 1985
- First issue: June 6, 1985
- Final issue Number: Winter 2024; 417
- Company: Veeps
- Country: United States
- Based in: Los Angeles
- Language: English
- Website: altpress.com
- ISSN: 1065-1667

Alternative Press is an American entertainment magazine primarily focused on music and culture. The magazine was originally founded in 1985 in Cleveland, Ohio, by Mike Shea. It generally provides readers with band interviews, photos, and relevant news. In 2020, Alternative Press was sold to MDDN, owned by Good Charlotte members Benji and Joel Madden, and relocated to Los Angeles. In 2024 or 2025, the magazine was acquired by Veeps, a ticketed livestream platform founded by the Madden brothers and owned by Live Nation. In August 2026, Veeps laid off nearly all of the publication's staff.

== History ==
The first issue of Alternative Press was distributed at concerts in Cleveland, Ohio, beginning on June 6, 1985 by AP's founder, Mike Shea, to advocate for bands playing underground music. The name Alternative Press was not a reference to the alternative rock genre, but referred to the magazine being an alternative to the local press. Shea began working on his first issue in his mother's house in Aurora, Ohio. Shea and a friend, Jimmy Kosicki, targeted the Cleveland neighborhood of Coventry. Financial problems plagued AP in its early years, and by the end of 1986, publication had paused due to its financial problems, only resuming until the spring of 1988.

In December 2020, Shea sold Alternative Press to MDDN, owned by Good Charlotte members Benji and Joel Madden, who expanded the magazine's online presence and reduced its publication frequency from monthly to quarterly. In December 2021, Alternative Press closed its offices in Cleveland and relocated to Burbank, California. Anna Zanes became the magazine's editor-in-chief starting with its Fall 2023 issue (#413). The magazine published its last issue in the winter of 2024 (#417). In 2024 or 2025, Alternative Press was acquired by Veeps, a ticketed livestream platform founded by the Madden brothers and owned by Live Nation. In August 2026, Veeps laid off nearly all of the publication's staff, alongside those of BrooklynVegan, Goldmine, and Revolver, amidst declining advertising revenues for music media outlets. The publications' websites remain online, but have largely ended day-to-day operations. Hours after the announcement, and amidst online backlash, Joel Madden and Good Charlotte performed with Hilary Duff at one of her concerts at Madison Square Garden.

== The Alternative Press Music Awards ==
The Alternative Press Music Awards was an annual music awards show in the United States, founded by the music magazine Alternative Press. The inaugural awards show in 2014 was hosted by Mark Hoppus, bassist and vocalist of Blink-182. In 2015, the hosts were Alex Gaskarth and Jack Barakat of All Time Low. In 2016 and 2017, the show was hosted by Andy Biersack of Black Veil Brides. A fourth award show was due to take place in the fall of 2018, but was postponed indefinitely.
