= Before – Volume One =

Mixtape by The Madden Brothers
- Released: November 11, 2011
- Recorded: Mid–2011
- Studio: LosMadden Studios
- Genre: Hip-hop
- Length: 42:15
- Label: LosMaddens
- Producer: The Madden Brothers; JayEbeats; Detail

The Madden Brothers chronology
Before – Volume One (2011)	Greetings from California (2014)

Before – Volume One is a 2011 mixtape, presented by Complex, released by The Madden Brothers which consists of Joel Madden and Benji Madden, who are best known as the lead vocalist and guitarist, respectively, for the American pop-punk band Good Charlotte. The Madden Brothers say that their "only real objective for doing this mixtape was to have fun and be creative". The tracks from the mixtape each feature at least one guest artist, except track 12, "A Million Tears (One Heart)".

The Madden Brothers state that this was done "out of frustration with the music business sometimes it causes us to need an avenue to just have fun, make music, and to put it out for the pure love of it...i can already say there will be a Volume 2 in the works, as many of [our] friends couldn't get in the studio in time to meet the deadline for Volume 1".

== Track listing ==
No.	Title	Length
1.	"Let Go" (featuring Mestizo, Hollywood Holt and Casey Veggies)	4:48
2.	"OHMYGOD(OMGMGK)" (featuring Machine Gun Kelly)	3:25
3.	"Take Me Back to Teenage Crime" (featuring Rockie Fresh)	3:50
4.	"Firetruck" (featuring Kreayshawn and Hollywood Holt)	3:04
5.	"The Right Track (So Cold)" (featuring Rockie Fresh)	3:02
6.	"In the Night" (featuring Wiz Khalifa and Detail)	3:50
7.	"The Trees" (featuring The Cool Kids)	2:52
8.	"Treated! Freestyle Interlude" (performed by Hollywood Holt)	2:08
9.	"Doin' My Thing" (featuring Tayyib Ali)	3:15
10.	"Made It Happen" (featuring Billy Blue)	3:28
11.	"Diamonds" (featuring Dirtywaters and Arkangel)	5:21
12.	"A Million Tears (One Heart)"	3:19
Total length:		42:15
