= Lifestyles of the Rich and Famous (Good Charlotte song) =

2002 single by Good Charlotte

Single by Good Charlotte

from the album The Young and the Hopeless
- Released: August 12, 2002
- Genre: Pop-punk
- Length: 3:10
- Label: Epic; Daylight
- Songwriters: Benji Madden; Joel Madden; Tim Armstrong
- Producer: Eric Valentine

Good Charlotte singles chronology
"Festival Song" (2001)	"Lifestyles of the Rich and Famous" (2002)	"The Anthem" (2003)

"Lifestyles of the Rich and Famous" is a song by American rock band Good Charlotte, written by Benji Madden, Joel Madden and Tim Armstrong for the band's second studio album The Young and the Hopeless. It was released as the lead single from the album in August 2002 and was the band's debut European single. Upon its release, the song reached a peak of number 20 on the US Billboard Hot 100 (their highest on that chart) and charted within the top 40 in several European countries, Australia, and New Zealand.

== Composition and writing ==
Composed in the key of C# major, the basic concept of "Lifestyles of the Rich and Famous" is the global obsession with fame and the way that celebrities are not appreciative of how fortunate they are.

The lyrics refer to a number of celebrities. Johnnie Cochran, a famous attorney who represented (amongst others) stars such as O. J. Simpson, who was acquitted of murdering his ex-wife Nicole Brown, is mentioned in the lines "Well did you know if you were famous you could kill your wife / and there's no such thing as 25 to life / as long as you got the cash to pay for Cochran?" A former mayor of Washington, D.C., Marion Barry – who was convicted on drug charges – is also mentioned in the lyrics: "and did you know if you were caught and you were smokin' crack / McDonald's wouldn't even wanna take you back / you could always just run for mayor of D.C."

The Village Voice writer Anthony Miccio says that the song "cops Burundi drums from 'Lust for Life,' Marion Barry jokes from Chris Rock, and dub-echo effects from Def Leppard's Hysteria. If you like all three, the song will make you crap your drawers."

== Music video ==
The music video premiered in September 2002 on MTV. It features cameo appearances from Tenacious D's Kyle Gass, former 'N Sync singer Chris Kirkpatrick, and Minutemen bassist Mike Watt. All three musicians appear in the courtroom scene - Gass plays the prosecutor while Kirkpatrick plays the witness "Chadwick Merryweather Hardy the Third". Watt plays the jury foreman. The dog questioned in the video is Benji and Joel's dog, CA$HDOGG. The Southern California rock band Lefty, who had been touring with Good Charlotte, also make a cameo appearance.

== Charts ==
=== Weekly charts ===
Chart (2002–2003)	Peak position
Australia (ARIA)	17
Austria (Ö3 Austria Top 40)	24
Belgium (Ultratop 50 Flanders)	37
Canada (Nielsen SoundScan)	49
Europe (Eurochart Hot 100)	18
Germany (GfK)	27
Ireland (IRMA)	20
Italy (FIMI)	48
Netherlands (Dutch Top 40)	18
Netherlands (Single Top 100)	23
New Zealand (Recorded Music NZ)	33
Scottish Singles Sales (Official Charts)	9
Sweden (Sverigetopplistan)	14
Switzerland (Schweizer Hitparade)	19
UK Singles (Official Charts)	8
UK Airplay (Music Week)	37
UK Rock & Metal (Official Charts)	1
US Billboard Hot 100	20
US Adult Pop Airplay (Billboard)	38
US Alternative Airplay (Billboard)	11
US Pop Airplay (Billboard)	6

=== Year-end charts ===
Chart (2002)	Position
Australia (ARIA)	77
US Modern Rock Tracks (Billboard)	60

Chart (2003)	Position
Sweden (Hitlistan)	56
US Mainstream Top 40 (Billboard)	41
US Modern Rock Tracks (Billboard)	80

== Certifications ==
Region	Certification	Certified units/sales
Australia (ARIA)	Gold	35,000^{^}
Germany (BVMI)	Gold	250,000^{‡}
New Zealand (RMNZ)	Platinum	30,000^{‡}
United Kingdom (BPI)	Platinum	600,000^{‡}
United States (RIAA)	Platinum	1,000,000^{‡}
^{^} Shipments figures based on certification alone.^{‡} Sales+streaming figures based on certification alone.

== Release history ==
Region	Date	Format(s)	Label(s)	Ref.
United States	August 12, 2002	Alternative radio	Epic; Daylight	
Australia	September 9, 2002	CD	Epic; Daylight	
Denmark	January 27, 2003	CD	Epic; Daylight	
United Kingdom	February 3, 2003	CD	Epic; Daylight	

== In popular culture ==
- The song was heard in the 2003 film Dickie Roberts: Former Child Star.
- A version of the song was used as the theme music for the Glenn Beck Program early in the 2004 presidential election season, but due to political differences with Good Charlotte, Beck was forced to replace the song with an edited version of Rage Against the Machine's "Killing in the Name".
- The song appeared in the Drake & Josh episode "Dune Buggy" in 2004, when Drake and Josh turn on the radio in their dune buggy and the song's chorus is heard.
- Parody band Apologetix produced a version of the song based on the events in Luke Chapter 16 in the Bible, named "Lifestyles of the Rich & Nameless".

== Awards ==
"Lifestyles of the Rich and Famous" won the "Viewer's Choice Award" at the MTV Video Music Awards in 2003. It also won the Kerrang! Award for Best Single.
