= Brad Williams (rugby league) =

Australian rugby league footballer

Personal information
- Full name: Bradley Williams

Playing information
- Position: Wing
Club
Years	Team	Pld	T	G	FG	P
1981–84	Parramatta Eels	24	8	0	0	25
1985	Canberra Raiders	14	3	0	0	12
	Total	38	11	0	0	37
- Source: As of 27 February 2023

Brad Williams is an Australian former professional rugby league footballer who played in the 1980s. He played for Parramatta and Canberra in the NSWRL competition.

== Playing career ==
Williams made his first grade debut for Parramatta in round 5 of the 1981 NSWRFL season against North Sydney at Cumberland Oval. Williams played seven games in his debut season and was a squad member of the Parramatta side which claimed their first premiership that year. In 1982, Williams played eight games as Parramatta claimed a second consecutive premiership. In 1983, Williams played a further eight games and experienced finals football for the first time as he was called into the team for their preliminary final against Canterbury. Parramatta would go on to win 18–4 with Williams scoring a try, however he was not selected for the grand final team which would win a third straight premiership. After one further year at Parramatta, Williams joined Canberra playing 14 games and scoring three tries.
