= Brad Williams =

Brad Williams may refer to:

- Brad Williams (cricketer) (born 1974), Australian cricketer
- Brad Williams (comedian) (born 1984), American comedian and actor who regularly appeared on the show Mind of Mencia
- Brad Williams (mnemonist) (born c. 1956), one of the only three people in the world with a condition called hyperthymestic syndrome
- Brad Williams (puppeteer) (1951–1993), American puppet designer for TV programs and literacy education
- Brad Williams (rugby league), Australian rugby league player
- Brad Williams (EastEnders), a fictional television character from British soap opera EastEnders
- Brad Allen Williams (born 1980), American guitarist, producer, and songwriter/composer
- Brad Williams, a fictional television character from American comedy series Happy Endings
