= MDDN =

American entertainment company

- Type: Private
- Industry: Entertainment
- Founded: 2015
- Founders: Joel Madden, Benji Madden, Josh Madden
- Headquarters: Burbank, California, United States
- Key people: Benji Madden (President)
- Services: Artist management, Artist development, Music publishing, Record label, Record production, Recording studio, Branding, Creative services, Digital media
- Divisions: MDDN Studios, MDDN Records, MDDN Publishing, MDDN Creative, MDDNvest
- Website: mddn.co

MDDN is an American entertainment company based in Burbank, California. Founded in 2015 by brothers Joel Madden, Benji Madden, and Josh Madden, the company operates in artist management, music publishing, production, branding, and digital media. Originally established as an artist management company, MDDN has expanded into recording, publishing, editorial media, and entertainment technology through ventures including MDDN Studios, the acquisition of Alternative Press, and the founders' involvement with Veeps.

== History ==
MDDN was founded in 2015 by Joel, Benji, and Josh Madden as an entertainment company focused on artist management, creative development, branding, publishing, and long-term career strategy for musicians and creators. The company was established to help artists build careers beyond the traditional record label model by combining management with branding, business development, creative services, and strategic partnerships.

The company grew out of a series of business ventures established by the Madden brothers outside of their music careers. Before launching MDDN, they had operated the clothing brands MADE and DCMA Collective, the production company Dead Executives, and the independent record label D.C. Flag. These ventures informed MDDN's artist-focused business model, which combined management with branding, creative services, production, and business development.

In 2019, MDDN partnered with ICM Partners to launch an artist representation initiative designed to identify and develop emerging artists through management, touring, branding, and digital media opportunities.

During the COVID-19 pandemic, Joel and Benji Madden expanded Veeps, a ticketed livestreaming platform originally developed from their work creating VIP experiences for artists, into a live music streaming service. Pollstar described the platform as an outgrowth of the founders' work with artists through MDDN, while Forbes reported that it evolved from tools the company had developed for artist engagement and VIP experiences.

== Business divisions and brands ==
MDDN provides management and creative services for recording artists, songwriters, producers, and other entertainment professionals. The company's activities include artist management, artist development, music publishing, record production, branding, digital media, and creative consulting. The company places an emphasis on artist development alongside traditional management. One of MDDN's earliest clients was the Australian band Chase Atlantic, which signed with the company in 2016 after being discovered by Joel and Benji Madden. Through MDDN, the band relocated to Los Angeles, developed new material, and later entered into a recording agreement with Warner Records.

MDDN manages a roster of recording artists, producers, songwriters, and mixers. Artists represented by the company have included Architects, Bad Omens, Boys Like Girls, Chase Atlantic, Good Charlotte, Poppy, Sleeping with Sirens, and Wavves. Its producer roster has included Jordan Fish, Zakk Cervini, Dan Lancaster, Andrew Goldstein, Erik Ron, Jon Levine, David Pramik, Justin Raisen, and Andrew Wells.

The company operates MDDN Studios, a recording studio in Burbank, California. The facility occupies the former Boom Boom Room recording complex, a commercial recording studio that hosted numerous major recording projects prior to MDDN's occupancy.

MDDN Studios has been credited as a recording location on commercially released albums including Double Dare by Waterparks, Generation Rx by Good Charlotte, amo by Bring Me the Horizon, How It Feels to Be Lost by Sleeping with Sirens, American Fall and 20/20 Vision by Anti-Flag, R.O.S.E. by Jessie J, Empty Hands by Poppy, and Sanctuary by Evanescence.

MDDN also operates MDDN Records, an independent record label through which releases by artists including Good Charlotte, Chase Atlantic, and Hollywood Undead have been issued.

MDDN's brands and affiliated businesses have included Veeps and Alternative Press. Veeps was co-founded by Joel and Benji Madden and developed from their work in artist management and direct-to-fan services. In January 2021, Live Nation Entertainment acquired a majority stake in Veeps.

In fall 2020, MDDN acquired Alternative Press from its founder, Mike Shea. The acquisition moved ownership of the publication from Cleveland to MDDN's operations in California.
