= The Anthem (Good Charlotte song) =

2003 single by Good Charlotte

Single by Good Charlotte

from the album The Young and the Hopeless
- B-side: "If You Leave"; "Acquiesce" (live); "Complicated"
- Released: January 13, 2003
- Studio: Barefoot (Los Angeles)
- Genre: Pop-punk; emo; rap rock
- Length: 2:55
- Label: Epic; Daylight
- Songwriters: Benji Madden; Joel Madden; John Feldmann
- Producer: Eric Valentine

Good Charlotte singles chronology
"Lifestyles of the Rich and Famous" (2002)	"The Anthem" (2003)	"Girls & Boys" (2003)

"The Anthem" is a song by American rock band Good Charlotte from their studio album, The Young and the Hopeless (2002). Members Joel Madden and Benji Madden originally wrote the song for a film soundtrack alongside John Feldmann, but it did not appear in the film. According to Joel Madden, the song is about "not living the way that you're supposed to live", and Benji Madden added that the song is about achieving one's goals.

"The Anthem" was released on January 13, 2003, as the second single from The Young and the Hopeless and charted in several countries, peaking at number 10 on the UK Singles Chart and number 43 on the US Billboard Hot 100. The song has received a gold certification in Australia and a platinum or multi-platinum certification in the United Kingdom and United States. The second disc of the UK CD single features a live cover of the song "Acquiesce" by Britpop band Oasis.

== Background and composition ==
When lead vocalist Joel Madden was 19, he went out to Los Angeles for the first time and met up with producer John Feldmann, and they went surfing together. Feldmann told Joel that a movie was looking for a soundtrack song, and Joel wrote an appropriate one with his brother Benji Madden and Feldmann that turned into "The Anthem". The movie ended up not wanting the song, but it became a charting hit for the band in several countries when they released it. Despite the title, Joel said, "I honestly didn't think 'The Anthem' would even be a big song."

In 2003, Joel described the lyrics:

[It's] a song about not living the way that you're supposed to live. Like I guess that in America everybody kinda looks at, to be successful you gotta go to college, get a job, a house, two cars, a wife and some kids. That's the American Dream or whatever. It's like, well, I could never go to college or whatever. I'm kinda proud of being looked down on because we've made something happen. We didn't have the most opportunities growing up.

"To us," added guitarist Billy Martin in the same interview, "it's a song saying that whatever goal you have, try and reach it." Composed in the key of D major, "The Anthem" is written in common time with a driving rock tempo.

== Critical reception ==
American trade magazine Variety ranked "The Anthem" as one of the best emo songs of all time in 2022.

== Release and chart performance ==
"The Anthem" was serviced to American alternative radio on January 13, 2003, and peaked at number 10 on the Billboard Modern Rock Tracks chart in late March 2003. The song then crossed over to contemporary hit radio, to which the song was released on March 3, 2003. Appearing as the Billboard Hot 100's "Hot Shot Debut" at number 56 later the same month, "The Anthem" took three more weeks to peak at number 43 on the listing, becoming Good Charlotte's second top-50 hit in the US. The song also charted on the Billboard Mainstream Top 40, where it reached number 11 in May 2003. On June 20, 2025, the song received a triple-platinum certification from the Recording Industry Association of America (RIAA) for sales and streaming figures exceeding three million units.

"The Anthem" was released in Australia as a CD single on March 3, 2003. The following week, the song debuted at number 14, its peak, on the ARIA Singles Chart and spent a second week at number 14 in April 2003 before descending the chart, totaling 18 weeks in the top 50. The Australian Recording Industry Association (ARIA) awarded the song a gold disc in 2003 for shipping over 35,000 copies in Australia. In New Zealand, the song first appeared on the RIANZ Singles Chart on March 16, 2003, and climbed to number 27 two weeks later, spending seven weeks on the chart. The track was released in the United Kingdom on August 18, 2003, when it debuted and peaked at number 10 on the UK Singles Chart to become Good Charlotte's third top-10 hit in the UK, and it was certified platinum by the British Phonographic Industry (BPI) in 2024 for sales and streams exceeding 600,000 units. Elsewhere in Europe, the song reached number 28 in Sweden, number 34 in Ireland, and number 52 in Germany.

== Track listings ==
US CD single

1. "The Anthem"
2. "Lifestyles of the Rich and Famous"

UK CD1

1. "The Anthem" – 2:55
2. "If You Leave" – 2:43
3. "The Motivation Proclamation" (live acoustic) – 3:42
4. "The Anthem" (video) – 2:55

UK CD2

1. "The Anthem" – 2:55
2. "Acquiesce" (live on BBC 3) – 3:50
3. "Complicated" – 2:49

European CD single

1. "The Anthem" – 2:55
2. "If You Leave" – 2:43

Australian CD single

1. "The Anthem" – 2:55
2. "Riot Girl" (acoustic version) – 2:22
3. "The Young and the Hopeless" (acoustic version) – 3:34
4. "Lifestyles of the Rich and Famous" (acoustic version) – 3:23

== Credits and personnel ==
Credits are adapted from the UK CD1 liner and disc notes.

Studio

- Recorded at Barefoot Studios (Los Angeles)

Personnel

- Benji Madden – writing
- Joel Madden – writing
- John Feldmann – writing
- Eric Valentine – production, engineering, mixing
- Ken Allardyce – engineering
- Brian "Big Bass" Gardner – mastering

== Charts ==
=== Weekly charts ===
Chart (2003)	Peak position
Australia (ARIA)	14
Germany (GfK)	52
Ireland (IRMA)	34
New Zealand (Recorded Music NZ)	27
Scotland Singles (OCC)	7
Sweden (Sverigetopplistan)	28
UK Singles (OCC)	10
UK Rock & Metal (OCC)	1
US Billboard Hot 100	43
US Alternative Airplay (Billboard)	10
US Pop Airplay (Billboard)	11

=== Year-end charts ===
Chart (2003)	Position
Australia (ARIA)	71
US Mainstream Top 40 (Billboard)	75
US Modern Rock Tracks (Billboard)	39

== Certifications ==
Region	Certification	Certified units/sales
Australia (ARIA)	Gold	35,000^{^}
New Zealand (RMNZ)	Platinum	30,000^{‡}
United Kingdom (BPI)	Platinum	600,000^{‡}
United States (RIAA)	3× Platinum	3,000,000^{‡}
^{^} Shipments figures based on certification alone.^{‡} Sales+streaming figures based on certification alone.

== Release history ==
Region	Date	Format(s)	Label(s)	Ref.
United States	January 13, 2003	Alternative radio	Epic; Daylight	
Australia	March 3, 2003	CD	Epic; Daylight	
United States	March 3, 2003	Contemporary hit radio	Epic; Daylight	
United States	April 1, 2003	Digital download	Epic; Daylight	
United Kingdom	August 18, 2003	CD; cassette	Epic; Daylight	
