= The Young and the Hopeless =

Studio album by Good Charlotte
- Released: October 1, 2002
- Recorded: February–May 2002
- Studios: Barefoot (Los Angeles, California)
- Genres: Pop-punk; emo
- Length: 45:52
- Labels: Epic; Daylight
- Producer: Eric Valentine

Good Charlotte chronology
Good Charlotte (2000)	The Young and the Hopeless (2002)	The Chronicles of Life and Death (2004)

Singles from The Young and the Hopeless
- 1. "Lifestyles of the Rich & Famous" Released: August 12, 2002; 2. "The Anthem" Released: January 13, 2003; 3. "Girls & Boys" Released: April 28, 2003; 4. "Hold On" Released: October 13, 2003; 5. "The Young & the Hopeless"/"Hold On" Released: January 13, 2004

The Young and the Hopeless is the second studio album by the American rock band Good Charlotte, released on October 1, 2002, by Epic and Daylight Records. Following the release of their self-titled debut album (2000), the band met producer Eric Valentine and engaged him for their next album. Sessions took place at Barefoot Studios in Los Angeles, California from February to May 2002. Josh Freese of the Vandals served as a session drummer. Most of the songs were written by brothers Benji and Joel Madden; three of the tracks were co-written with Valentine, Goldfinger frontman John Feldmann and Rancid frontman Tim Armstrong.

"Lifestyles of the Rich & Famous" served as the lead single, released in August 2002. The album was promoted with a support slot for No Doubt before the group embarked on their own tour of the United States, with subsequent shows in Japan, Europe, Australia, and New Zealand. "The Anthem" was released as the second single in February 2003 prior to the band co-headlining the Honda Civic Tour. "Girls & Boys" was released as the third single. "Hold On" was first released to alternative rock radio in September 2003, and later released as a joint single with "The Young & the Hopeless" in January 2004.

The Young and the Hopeless received generally negative reviews from music critics, who made comments about the songs' clichéd lyrics. Despite the mixed to negative critical reception, the album was a major commercial success, being certified three times platinum by the Recording Industry Association of America (RIAA). Three of the album's singles—"Lifestyles of the Rich & Famous", "The Anthem", and "Girls & Boys"—crossed over from modern rock radio to pop radio. Outside the US, the album charted within the top 20 in New Zealand, Sweden, Australia, the UK, and Austria, and reached lower positions in Japan, Germany, Switzerland, France, and the Netherlands. It was certified platinum by the Australian Recording Industry Association (ARIA) and by the British Phonographic Industry (BPI), as well as two times platinum by Music Canada (MC). The album and "Lifestyles of the Rich & Famous" were nominated for several awards, with the latter winning the Kerrang! Award for Best Single. Retrospective reviews have been more positive; the album appeared on best-of lists by Rock Sound and Rolling Stone, and earned the Classic Album Award at the Alternative Press Music Awards.

== Background and recording ==
After leaving their home state of Maryland, Good Charlotte were signed to Epic imprint Daylight Records and released their debut album, Good Charlotte, in September 2000. It did not sell as well as the label hoped, and the group were nearly dropped. By the end of 2000, vocalist Joel Madden said they had a lot of new material ready for their next album, and had been performing "The Story of My Life" by April 2001. The minor success of "Little Things", coupled with appearing at Warped Tour and touring alongside Blink-182 in 2001 helped increase their popularity. Sometime afterwards, drummer Aaron Escolopio left the group to join his brother's band Wakefield. He was replaced by Nate Foutz of Vroom, who stayed with the group for six weeks. Dusty Bill was then engaged to play drums; he remained with the group for a year. While promoting the self-titled album, the group met Eric Valentine at a show, and decided to work with him on their next record.

Valentine, who acted as producer, said he was interested in the band because of their writing, which he felt was "a little deeper" than that of their contemporaries. Madden said they "wanted a hit record, to do something big and important ... and that’s where [Valentine] came in". Recording of The Young and the Hopeless took place at Barefoot Studios in Los Angeles, California, between February 1 and May 1, 2002. Valentine often mediated between the band members, who would bicker during pre-production. Josh Freese of The Vandals was brought in as a session member; Joel Madden knew Freese from touring and asked him to drum on the album.

Valentine and Ken Allardyce acted as engineers, while Jason Slater, Dave Cooley and Wes Seidman did additional editing. David Campbell conducted strings, which were arranged by Valentine and Eric Campbell and engineered by Nate Kunkel. Valentine mixed the recordings and Brian Gardner mastered them at Bernie Grundman Mastering in Los Angeles. Benji Madden said, "Nothing about that record was pre-meditated, we were just having fun, and trying to do the best we could to achieve that goal". In 2016, Benji Madden said of the album: "We’d gone out into the world and felt both the positive and the negative. And on The Young And The Hopeless we decided to really take a direction and stand up for ourselves, in a way."

== Composition ==
Discussing the album name, Joel Madden said; The Young and the Hopeless "felt like the generation we were in ... I think it was the way a generation felt in the early 2000s. Everything started to change over". All of the songs on the album were written by the Madden brothers, except for "A New Beginning" and "The Anthem". The former was written by Benji Madden and Valentine, and the latter was written by the Madden brothers and Goldfinger frontman John Feldmann. All of the songs were arranged by the band, except "A New Beginning", which was arranged by Benji Madden and Valentine. Musically, the album has been described as pop-punk, and compared with the work of Blink-182, Green Day, and MxPx.

With the opening track "A New Beginning", the group wanted to make something different. According to Joel Madden, they adored the work of Danny Elfman and wanted to emulate his style, specifically in the vein of The Nightmare Before Christmas (1993). "The Anthem" was written after producers of an unspecified movie asked for a song to include on the soundtrack. According to Benji Madden, the producers wanted a song similar to "Little Things", asking; "Can you write another loser anthem?" The brothers wrote it with Feldmann because they loved Goldfinger and wanted to work with him before they worked with Valentine and Don Gilmore. The movie producers used "Little Things" instead; as a result, "The Anthem" features the lyric "Another loser anthem". The latter's bridge was written as a joke and was intended to be replaced later but was left on the album. "Lifestyles of the Rich & Famous" features the drum motif of "Lust for Life" (1977) by Iggy Pop, and is social commentary about the freedom celebrities have. While "The Story of My Old Man" is predominantly about the Madden brothers' father, it references Benji Madden's experience with alcohol. They briefly considered not releasing the track, which they found embarrassing, but they included it on the album because they felt their fans might relate to it.

"Girls & Boys" was written after an evening during which the Madden brothers tried to enter a club but were twice turned away. They were allowed into a third club; according to Benji Madden, they were "just kids without a lot of experience, just kind of observing what was going on". He discovered the "dynamic of certain types of people with different agendas ... to be amusing". They wrote the song the following day. "My Bloody Valentine" is about a man who kills the boyfriend of the woman he has a crush for. "Hold On" is an anti-suicide song that talks about coping with life; Joel Madden wrote it after receiving letters from fans, who said the band helped them through difficult periods of their lives. "Riot Girl" evokes the work of Rancid. "Say Anything" is a string-laden ballad that originated in 1999 under the name "Time After Time", when it had a different set of lyrics. "The Day That I Die" discusses a person's final days, while "Emotionless" was written about the realization the Madden brothers would not talk to their father again. Madden said of the latter; "We have to come to our own kind of closure. It's kind of a song we wrote for ourselves".

== Release ==
During Good Charlotte's appearance on 2002 Warped Tour, Autopilot Off's Phil Robinson was filling in as Good Charlotte's temporary drummer; the Used, who were aware Good Charlotte needed a drummer, introduced them to Chris Wilson. Shortly after this, Wilson became the group's drummer. In July 2002, the group filmed a video for "Lifestyles of the Rich & Famous"; it was directed by Bill Fishman and features appearances from 'NSYNC vocalist Chris Kirkpatrick, Tenacious D guitarist Kyle Gass, and Minutemen bassist Mike Watt. In the video, the group perform inside a mansion, before police surround the building. The band are arrested and appear in a courtroom. The song was released to modern rock radio on August 12 that year and was released as a CD single on September 9. It includes the tracks "Cemetery", "The Click" and an acoustic version of "Lifestyles of the Rich & Famous" as B-sides.

The Young and the Hopeless was released on October 1, 2002, through Epic and Daylight Records. The music video for "The Anthem" premiered on MTV's Total Request Live on January 15, 2003; it was directed by duo Smith N' Borin and was filmed in Huntington Beach, California, in December 2002 over a 16-hour period. The clip depicts the group riding down a street on lowrider bikes with cameras fixed to the bikes' handlebars and shows the band members partying with their friends. Members of New Found Glory, Mest, and Home Grown appear during the video.

On January 13, 2003, "The Anthem" was released as a single. The CD single includes acoustic versions of "Riot Girl", "The Young & the Hopeless", and "Lifestyles of the Rich & Famous" as B-sides. The Young and the Hopeless was released in the UK in February. The group filmed a video for "Girls & Boys" with Smith N' Borin during a two-day break in New Zealand later that year. The video treatment was a concept the directors had for a while but could not find an artist with whom it would fit until they worked with Good Charlotte. The video includes short vignettes that display the personalities of each band member; Benji Madden acts as a playboy and oils a woman; guitarist Billy Martin plays video games; Wilson throws drinks; bassist Paul Thomas relaxes with two women who feed him pretzels; and Joel Madden does hip-hop dancing. The ending of the video shows an elderly woman offering Benji Madden a bowl of cereal; this was influenced by the film Happy Gilmore (1996).

On April 28, 2003, "Girls & Boys" was released as a single in Europe. The CD version also included "If You Leave", a live version of "The Motivation Proclamation", and "Complicated" as B-sides. To promote the group's September–November arena tour, "Hold On" was released to alternative rock radio on October 13, 2003. In October, the group filmed a music video for the track with director Samuel Bayer. It premiered on Total Request Live the following month. For the music video, the group collaborated with the American Foundation for Suicide Prevention; it features people with their dead relatives and people who have attempted suicide. Later, on January 13, 2004, the latter track and "The Young & the Hopeless" were released as a joint single. The music video for "The Young & the Hopeless" was directed by Sam Erickson and the Madden brothers. The video was filmed on a sound stage in Indianapolis, Indiana. The set was filled with trophies and ribbons, which the band destroy towards the end of the video. In September 2003, the album was reissued as a two-CD package with Good Charlotte.

The Young and the Hopeless was pressed on vinyl in 2014 and 2016 by Enjoy the Ride Records. Four tracks from it—"The Anthem" (by Million $ Mano and featured Hollywood Holt), "Girls & Boys" (by Ed Banger Allstars), "The Young & the Hopeless" (by Mr. Hahn) and "Hold On" (by the Academy Is...)—were remixed for inclusion on Good Charlotte's Greatest Remixes (2008) compilation. "Lifestyles of the Rich & Famous", "The Anthem", "Girls & Boys", "The Young & the Hopeless" and "Hold On" were included on the band's Greatest Hits (2010) compilation.

== Touring and TV appearances ==
Between late June and mid-August 2002, Good Charlotte appeared on that year's Warped Tour. The Madden brothers embarked on an Australian promotional tour, which included appearances on The Panel and whatUwant, in addition to a performance for Triple M. The band appeared on Late Night with Conan O'Brien in early October, before supporting No Doubt on their arena tour for a few shows; Good Charlotte unsuccessfully tried to appear on the whole trek, but were eventually replaced by Garbage. In October and November, Good Charlotte embarked on a headlining US tour, and appeared at three shows of the Boom Boom Huck Jam tour. Later in November, the band appeared on Last Call with Carson Daly. They then went on a short UK tour, which ended with a supporting slot for Our Lady Peace. Upon returning to the US, they played a variety of radio festivals, and concluded the year with a performance at MTV's New Year's Eve broadcast in New York City. They started 2003 with Japanese and European tours, with New Found Glory in January and February 2003. On February 24, 2003, Good Charlotte appeared on The Tonight Show with Jay Leno, and soon afterwards, went to Australia and New Zealand.

After a performance on Saturday Night Live, they co-headlined the three-month long Honda Civic Tour with New Found Glory between April and June 2003. The first half the trek was supported by Less Than Jake and Roger Miret and the Disasters, with MxPx supporting the second half. In mid-June 2003, the Madden brothers sung at KROQ Weenie Roast acoustically because Good Charlotte's guitarist Martin had to attend a wedding. In August, the group performed at the MTV Video Music Awards. When playing at the Reading and Leeds Festivals, the audience's reaction was very negative and some of them bottled the band. Between September and November, the group embarked on a headlining US arena trek, the first half of which was supported by Mest and Something Corporate, while the remaining half was supported by Eve 6 and Goldfinger. The Living End were also due to support, but had to cancel, citing issues with their US visas. On November 12, 2003, Good Charlotte appeared on Total Request Live. In December, the group went toured the UK with Sugarcult and Mest. In January 2004, the group performed various shows in Japan.

== Critical reception ==
Professional ratings
Review scores
Source	Rating
AllMusic	3/5 stars
Entertainment Weekly	C+
NME	8/10
New Straits Times	2/5 stars
Robert Christgau	(3-star Honorable Mention)
Rock Hard	6/10
Rolling Stone	2/5 stars
The Spokesman-Review	A−
Uncut	2/5 stars

Reviewers were split on the album's pop-punk sound. In his brief review, rock critic Robert Christgau summarised this aspect as: "honest pop band presents its songs punk, and that makes some people so mad". Mark Beaumont of NME wrote a positive review, saying that this was the "sudden extra fold of punk-pop's cerebral cortex, the evolutionary leap into an unexpected maturity". Kristina Feliciano of Entertainment Weekly deemed the record generic, writing; "These 14 tidily produced songs not only sound a lot like each other, they also resemble ones by someone else—namely, blink-182. And that band’s tunes derive from elsewhere still." The staff at Uncut was slightly more positive, commenting that while the band came across as a lighter version of Green Day, "there are enough solid rock moments to keep their youthful following happy". Buffo Schnadelbach of Rock Hard noted that the "somewhat stereotypical mix of cheerfully upbeat catchy tunes, slightly melancholic anthems and almost pure pop numbers gives me a lot more amusement". Rolling Stone writer Greg Kot considered the group to be "much more persuasive when they let their vulnerability crack through the surface of these slightly overbaked songs, in which elaborate production touches mask the band's three-chord limitations". R.S. Murthi of New Straits Times said the songs "from a wastrel's life aren't always captivatingly present, at least musically". PopMatters writer Adrien Begrand was harsher, deducing that the band have "very little musical range. All they do is play the same three chords and pop vocal melodies".

Several critics lambasted the album's lyrics. AllMusic reviewer Tom Semioli called it "downright predictable" as it rejigs "worn clichés aplenty on each track". Chart Attack's Steve Servos complained about the "clichéd lyrics of hard knocks and spoiled celebrities", going on to say that "good songwriters have a knack for writing personal, therapeutic lyrics without coming across as such. Good Charlotte haven't learned this crucial lesson yet". Begrand went further; when citing lyrics on the album that criticize reviews, he responded, "Maybe if the band dropped all the pretense of their supposed punk aesthetic, from the spiky hair to the piercings, and actually wrote and produced albums that contain good, honest, DIY substance, and not this corporate rock sodapop garbage, then perhaps they could find something a bit more pertinent to complain about". Kerrang! countered this, stating that "unlike the usual dumb-ass punk pop japery peddled" by their peers, the band were able to do it with "substance, style, and an occasional deeper exploration of sociopolitical themes". Beaumont and Janet Foreyt of The Spokesman-Review backed this up, with the former adding that Good Charlotte "are actually Jimmy Eat World with something interesting to say", while the latter said that after "several listens [...] the surprisingly intelligent lyrics begin to shine".

=== Accolades and legacy ===
The Young and the Hopeless won the Choice Music: Album award at the 2003 Teen Choice Awards. The "Lifestyles of the Rich & Famous" music video was nominated for Best Group Video, Best Rock Video and Viewer's Choice awards at the 2003 MTV Video Music Awards; it lost Best Group Video to "The Scientist" (2002) by Coldplay and Best Rock Video to "Somewhere I Belong" (2003) by Linkin Park, ultimately winning the Viewer's Choice award. "Lifestyles of the Rich & Famous" won a 2003 Kerrang! Award for Best Single. Cleveland.com ranked "Lifestyles of the Rich & Famous" at number 89 and "The Anthem" at number 38 on their list of the top 100 pop-punk songs.

Following the release of The Young and the Hopeless, Good Charlotte became one of the most prominent acts of the early 2000s pop punk movement. In 2005, it was one of the launch titles for the DualDisc format. In a retrospective piece in 2012, Rock Sound stated that the album was the beginning of the band's "world domination, and opened up a LOT of doors for people just getting into rock and pop-punk circa 2002". Luke Hemmings of 5 Seconds of Summer has expressed admiration for the album. Rock Sound ranked The Young and the Hopeless at number 22 on the list of best albums in their lifetime, number 36 on The 51 Most Essential Pop Punk Albums of All Time list, and number 37 in 101 Modern Classics list. In 2016, the album was given the Classic Album Award at the Alternative Press Music Awards. Rolling Stone ranked it at number 19 on their list of the 50 Greatest Pop-Punk Albums.

== Commercial performance ==
The Young and the Hopeless debuted at number seven on the US Billboard 200 with first-week sales of 117,000 copies. By August 2003, the album had sold over two million copies, and by October 2004, three million. As of 2011, the album had sold over 3.5 million copies in the US and has been certified triple platinum by the Recording Industry Association of America. It reached number 18 and 104 on the Billboard 200 year-end charts in 2003 and 2004, respectively. Outside of the US, the album peaked at number six in New Zealand, number seven in Sweden, number nine in Australia, number 15 in the UK, number 20 in Austria, number 24 in Japan, number 25 in Canada, number 37 in Germany, number 46 in Switzerland, number 52 in France, and number 57 in the Netherlands. It was certified gold in France by the Syndicat National de l'Édition Phonographique (SNEP), in Japan by Recording Industry Association of Japan (RIAJ), and in Sweden by Grammofonleverantörernas förening (GFL). It was also certified platinum by the Australian Recording Industry Association (ARIA) and by the British Phonographic Industry (BPI) and the Recorded Music NZ (RMNZ), as well as and double platinum by Music Canada (MC). The album's singles lifted the band from modern rock to top 40 radio stations as "Lifestyles of the Rich & Famous", "Girls & Boys", and "The Anthem" crossed over. Each track found success due to being played on Total Request Live.

=== Singles ===
"Lifestyles of the Rich & Famous" peaked at number 20 on the US Billboard Hot 100, number six on Mainstream Top 40, number 11 on Alternative Songs, and number 38 on Adult Top 40. Outside of the US, the song peaked at number eight in the UK, number 14 in Sweden, number 17 in Australia, and number 19 in Switzerland. It was certified gold by the ARIA and by the BPI.

"The Anthem" peaked at number 43 on the Billboard Hot 100, number ten on Alternative Songs, and number 11 on Mainstream Top 40. It also entered at number ten in the UK, number 14 in Australia, number 27 in New Zealand, and number 28 in Sweden. It was certified gold by the RIAA and the ARIA. "The Anthem" was also certified silver by the BPI.

"Girls & Boys" peaked at number 48 on the Billboard Hot 100, and number ten on Mainstream Top 40. It also peaked at number six in the UK, number 25 in New Zealand, number 33 in Australia, and number 41 in the Netherlands. The song was certified silver by the BPI. "Hold On" peaked at number 63 on the Billboard Hot 100, number 17 on Mainstream Top 40, and number 34 in the UK. "The Young & the Hopeless" charted in the US at number 28 on the Alternative Songs, and peaked at number 34 in the UK.

== Track listing ==
All songs written by Benji and Joel Madden, except where noted.

The Young and the Hopeless track listing
No.	Title	Writer(s)	Length
1.	"A New Beginning"	B. Madden; Eric Valentine	1:49
2.	"The Anthem"	B. Madden; J. Madden; John Feldmann	2:55
3.	"Lifestyles of the Rich & Famous"	B. Madden; J. Madden; Tim Armstrong	3:10
4.	"Wondering"		3:31
5.	"The Story of My Old Man"		2:42
6.	"Girls & Boys"		3:01
7.	"My Bloody Valentine"		3:54
8.	"Hold On"		4:06
9.	"Riot Girl"		2:17
10.	"Say Anything"		4:21
11.	"The Day That I Die"		2:58
12.	"The Young & the Hopeless"		3:32
13.	"Emotionless"		4:02
14.	"Movin' On"		3:26
Total length:			45:52

== Personnel ==
Personnel per booklet.

Good Charlotte

- Joel Madden – lead vocals
- Benji Madden – guitars, backing vocals; lead vocals (tracks 11 and 13), co-lead vocals (track 12)
- Billy Martin – guitars, keyboards
- Paul Thomas – bass

Additional musicians

- Josh Freese – drums
- David Campbell – string conductor
- Eric Valentine – string arranger
- Eric Campbell – string arranger

Production

- Eric Valentine – producer, engineer, mixing
- Ken Allardyce – engineer
- Stephen Jarvis – equipment technician
- Jason Slater – additional computer editing
- Dave Cooley – additional computer editing
- Wes Seidman – additional computer editing
- Nate Kunkel – string engineer
- Trevor Whatever – studio assistant
- Elsie May Valentine – additional studio assistant
- Brian Gardner – mastering

Artwork

- Sam Erickson – photography
- Sean Evans – art direction

== Charts ==
=== Weekly charts ===
Chart performance for The Young and the Hopeless
Chart (2002–2004)	Peak position
Australian Albums (ARIA)	9
Austrian Albums (Ö3 Austria)	20
Canadian Albums (Billboard)	25
Dutch Albums (Album Top 100)	57
European Albums Chart	40
French Albums (SNEP)	52
German Albums (Offizielle Top 100)	37
Japanese Albums (Oricon)	24
New Zealand Albums (RMNZ)	6
Scottish Albums (Official Charts)	9
Swedish Albums (Sverigetopplistan)	7
Swiss Albums (Schweizer Hitparade)	46
UK Albums (Official Charts)	15
UK Rock & Metal Albums (Official Charts)	21
US Billboard 200	7
US Top Album Sales (Billboard)	7
US Top Catalog Albums (Billboard)	9

=== Year-end charts ===
Year-end chart performance for The Young and the Hopeless
Chart (2002)	Position
Canadian Alternative Albums (Nielsen SoundScan)	74
Chart (2003)	Position
Australian Albums (ARIA)	31
New Zealand Albums (RMNZ)	28
Swedish Albums (Sverigetopplistan)	23
UK Albums (OCC)	47
US Billboard 200	18
Worldwide Albums (IFPI)	33
Chart (2004)	Position
US Billboard 200	108

=== Decade-end charts ===
Decade-end chart performance for The Young and the Hopeless
Chart (2000–2009)	Position
US Billboard 200	126

== Certifications ==
Certifications for The Young and the Hopeless
Region	Certification	Certified units/sales
Australia (ARIA)	Platinum	70,000^{^}
Canada (Music Canada)	2× Platinum	200,000^{^}
France (SNEP)	Gold	100,000^{*}
Germany (BVMI)	Gold	150,000^{‡}
Japan (RIAJ)	Gold	100,000^{^}
New Zealand (RMNZ)	Platinum	15,000^{^}
Sweden (GLF)	Gold	30,000^{^}
United Kingdom (BPI)	Platinum	300,000^{^}
United States (RIAA)	4× Platinum	4,000,000^{‡}
^{*} Sales figures based on certification alone.^{^} Shipments figures based on certification alone.^{‡} Sales+streaming figures based on certification alone.
