= Benji Madden =

American guitarist (born 1979)

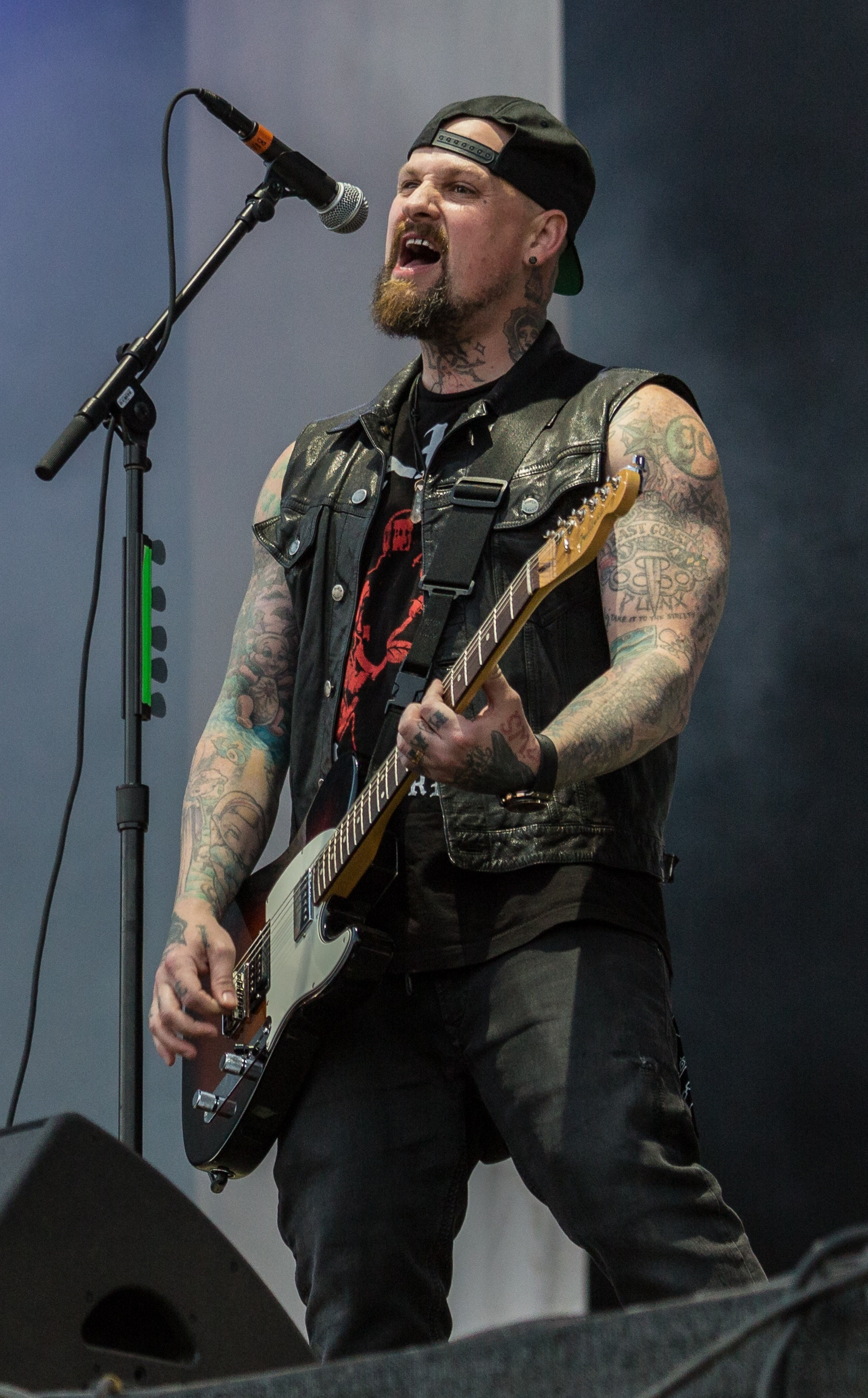
- Madden performing in 2017
- Born: Benjamin Levi Combs; March 11, 1979 (age 47); Waldorf, Maryland, U.S.
- Occupations: Musician; songwriter
- Years active: 1995–present
- Spouse: Cameron Diaz (m. 2015)
- Children: 3
- Relatives: Joel Madden (twin brother); Nicole Richie (sister-in-law)
- Awards: Full list
- Musical career
- Origin: La Plata, Maryland, U.S
- Genres: Pop-punk; pop rock; punk rock; alternative rock
- Instruments: Guitar; vocals
- Member of: Good Charlotte; The Madden Brothers

Benjamin Levi Madden (né Combs; born March 11, 1979) is an American musician who is the rhythm guitarist and backing vocalist for the rock band Good Charlotte–for which he has received various awards–and the pop rock collaboration the Madden Brothers. He formed both of these acts with his twin brother, Joel, with whom he was a coach on The Voice Australia from 2015 to 2016.

== Early life ==
Madden was born Benjamin Levi Combs on March 11, 1979, in Waldorf, Maryland, to Robin Madden and Roger Combs (d. 2019). He has an identical twin, Joel Madden, with whom he formed the band Good Charlotte. He also has an older brother named Josh and a younger sister named Sarah. All attended La Plata High School in La Plata, Maryland.

== Career ==
In 1996, Madden started Good Charlotte with his twin brother Joel.

While still playing in Good Charlotte, both Madden brothers wrote and produced for other artists. Madden was a co-writer and co-producer of some of the songs on Hilary Duff's Most Wanted (2005) compilation album. He later helped write the songs "Amnesia" for the pop rock band 5 Seconds of Summer and "No Ordinary Girl" for pop artist Kalin and Myles. He has appeared as a back-up vocalist for artists such as MxPx, Kill Hannah, Apoptygma Berzerk, Mest, The 69 Eyes, Sean Kingston, Three 6 Mafia, Chamillionaire, and Matisyahu.

Madden started the fashion line called Made Clothing in 2001, along with his brothers Joel and Josh. In early 2006, it became DCMA Collective. A DCMA Collective store opened in Los Angeles on March 15, 2008, but later closed.

On April 3, 2010, Madden took part in a boxing match against MTV and VH1 host Riki Rachtman at Ellismania 5: Get These Brawls. The event was hosted by Jason Ellis at The Joint in the Hard Rock Hotel and Casino in Las Vegas. Madden beat Rachtman by knockout at 1 minute and 42 seconds into the first round.

On November 11, 2011, Madden and his brother Joel Madden released a free mix-tape, "The Madden Brothers: Before Volume 1". It contains new artists the brothers were personally interested in. Their brother Josh Madden helped to produce the mix-tape. Then unknown rappers, Machine Gun Kelly, Rockie Fresh, Kreayshawn, Casey Veggies, HXLT, and Wiz Khalifa all appeared on the mix-tape.

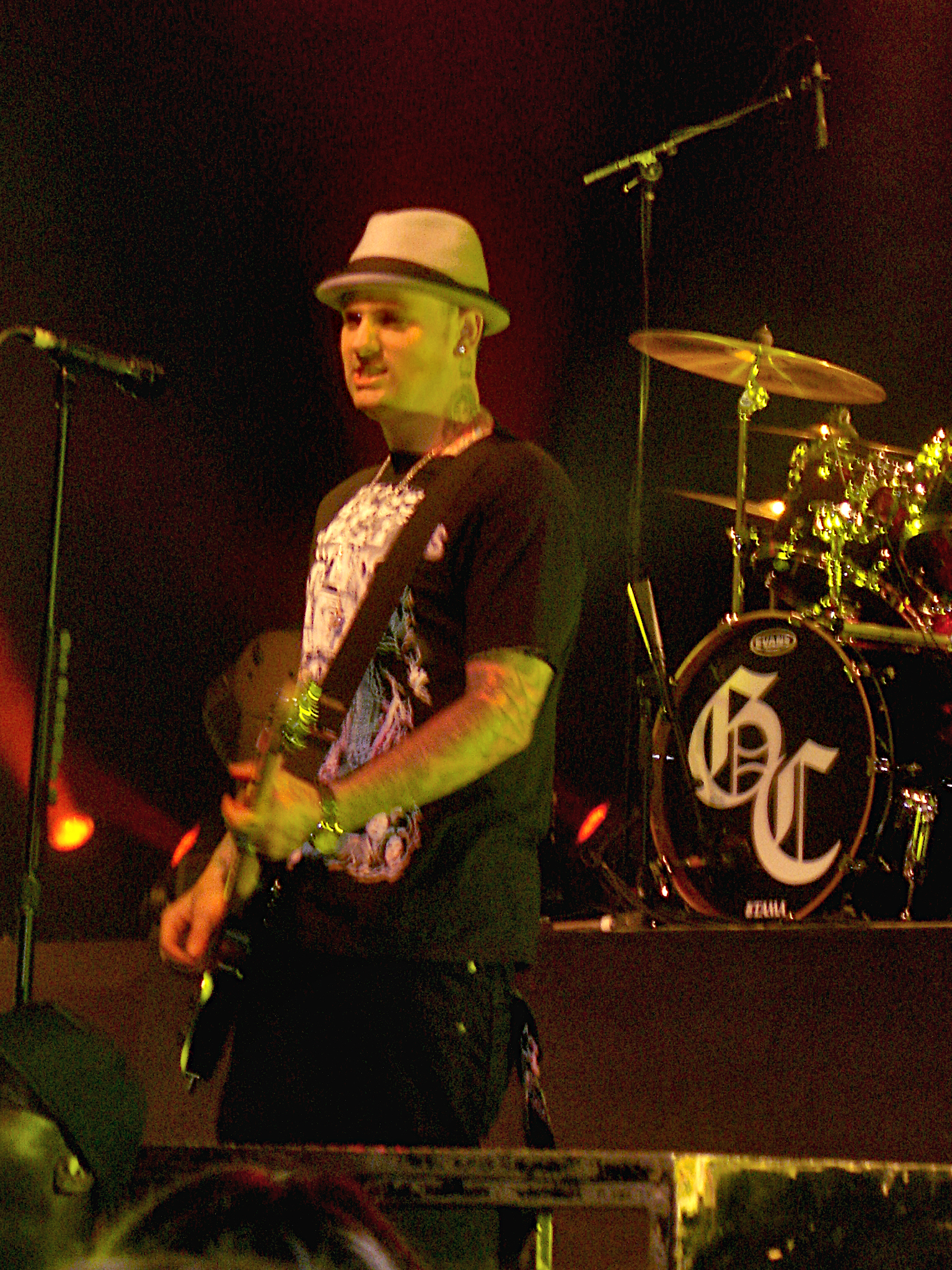
Madden on stage with Good Charlotte

In 2012, Benji appeared on the TV show The Voice Australia, alongside Joel as joint mentor-judges.

In early 2013, Benji helped write Tonight Alive's song "Breakdown". He sang back-up vocals at the end of the song and made an appearance in the video.

In 2014, electronic dance music artist TJR released his track "Come Back Down", which features Benji on the track's vocals. The Madden Brothers recording "Greetings from California" was released on September 16, 2014.

In mid-2014, both of the Madden brothers appeared as coaches on The Voice Kids Australia in a double chair, after the example of the Dutch The Voice of Holland and The Voice Kids Holland edition in which the singer's duo Nick & Simon appeared as a judging duo between 2010 and 2015. In early 2015, Benji joined Joel as a coach on the main edition of The Voice, bringing the number of coaches up to five.

In 2015 Madden and his two brothers formally started their company MDDN, of which Benji is CEO, offering artist management, artist development and creative services. The company gained success quickly with the brothers taking management of Jessie J, Chase Atlantic, Architects, Bad Omens, Waterparks, Eyedress, Poppy and More.

Madden and his brother Joel co-founded the streaming platform Veeps in 2017, and are co-CEOs. Live Nation Entertainment acquired a majority stake in the platform in January 2021.

== Discography ==
=== with The Madden Brothers ===
- Before – Volume One (2011)
- Greetings from California (2014)

==== Vocal appearances ====
Year	Song	Artist(s)	Album
2001	"Let's Go"	X-Ecutioners	
2002	"January"	Goldfinger	Open Your Eyes
2003	"Jaded (These Years)"	Mest	Mest
2003	"It's Alright"	MxPx	Before Everything & After
2003	"On the Outs"	MxPx	Before Everything & After
2004	"Are You Ready?"	Hazen Street	Hazen Street
2004	"All That"	Hazen Street	Hazen Street
2004	"Last Train Home"	Lostprophets	Start Something
2004	"Jump"	N.E.R.D	Fly or Die
2007	"Tightly Wound"	MxPx	Secret Weapon
2007	"Sex Without Love"	Ben Lee	Ripe
2008	"My Own Way"	Three 6 Mafia	Last 2 Walk
2009	"Apollo (Live on Your TV)"	Apoptygma Berzerk	Rocket Science
2009	"Darkness into Light"	Matisyahu	Light
2009	"Dead N' Gone"	The 69 Eyes	Back in Blood
2009	"Shoulda Let U Go"	Sean Kingston	Tomorrow
2009	"Snowblinded"	Kill Hannah	Wake Up the Sleepers
2013	"Breakdown"	Tonight Alive	The Other Side
2014	"Come Back Down"	TJR	
2019	"Never Enough"	Sleeping with Sirens	How It Feels to Be Lost
2020	"Second Chances"	Hollywood Undead	New Empire, Vol. 1

=== Filmography ===
==== Film ====
Year	Title	Role	Notes
2001	Not Another Teen Movie	Prom band member	
2006	Live Freaky Die Freaky	Interrogator #1	Voice only
2006	Material Girls	Mistaken valet #2	
2006	Fast Future Generation	Himself	
2007	Punk's Not Dead	Himself	
2008	Paris, Not France	Himself	
2009	6 Beers of Separation	Himself	
2016	I'll Sleep When I'm Dead	Himself	

==== Television ====
Year	Title	Role	Notes
2004	Punk'd	Himself	1 episode
2009	Australian Idol	Himself (guest judge)	2 episodes
2011	The Electric Company	Himself	2 episodes
2014	The Voice Kids	Himself (coach)	All episodes
2015–2016	The Voice Australia	Himself (coach)	All episodes
2022	Celebrity Wheel of Fortune	Himself (contestant)	1 episode
2026	The Voice	Himself / Advisor	2 episodes (Season 29; for Team Adam

==== Music videos ====
- Rancid – "Fall Back Down"
- The White Tie Affair – "Candle (Sick and Tired)"
- Junior Sanchez – "Elevator"
- Young Dre the Truth – "Cheah Bah"
- Mest – "Jaded (These Years)"
- The 69 Eyes – "Dead N' Gone"
- Fenix Tx – "Threesome"
- Rad Omen – "Rad Anthem"
- Brand New – "Jude Law and a Semester Abroad"
- Escape the Fate – "10 Miles Wide"
- The Madden Brothers – "Oh My God"
- The Fray – "Love Don't Die"
- The Madden Brothers – "We Are Done"

== Awards and nominations ==
For his work as a guitarist for the alternative rock band Good Charlotte, he has received various accolades, including an MTV Video Music Award, a Nickelodeon Kids' Choice Award, and an NRJ Music Award.

== Personal life ==
In February 2008, Madden broke up with his long-time fiancée, Sophie Monk.

Madden began dating actress Cameron Diaz in May 2014. The two were engaged before Christmas Day in 2014 and were married on January 5, 2015, in a Jewish-inspired ceremony, at their Beverly Hills home. On December 30, 2019, they had a daughter via surrogate pregnancy. On March 22, 2024, Benji announced that he and Diaz had a son. On May 4, 2026, they announced that they had a second son.

Madden has many tattoos, including a tattoo of Benjamin Franklin, which covers his entire back.
