= Joel Madden =

American singer (born 1979)

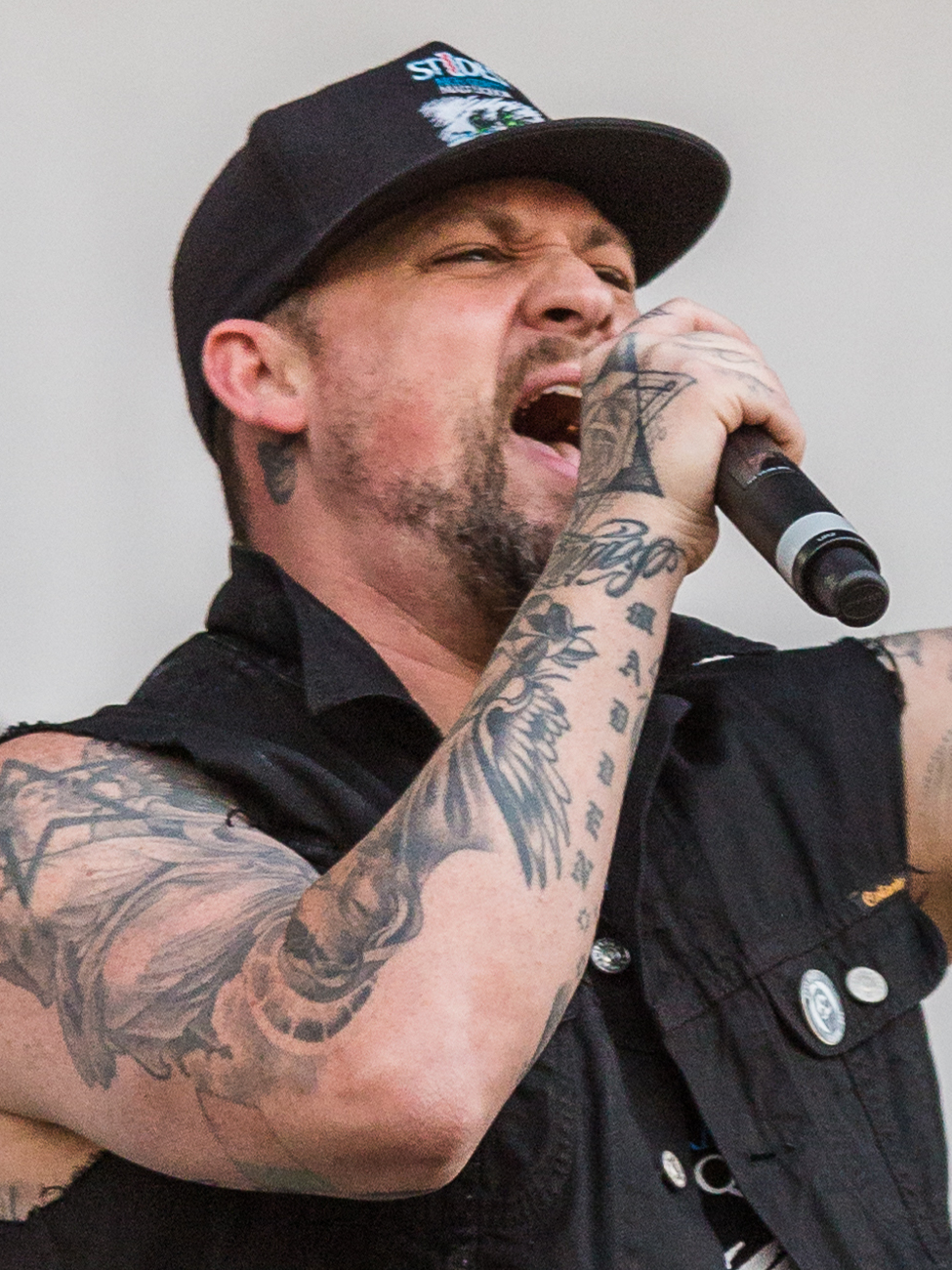
- Madden performing in 2017
- Born: Joel Rueben Combs; March 11, 1979 (age 47); Waldorf, Maryland, U.S.
- Occupations: Singer; songwriter
- Years active: 1995–present
- Spouse: Nicole Richie (m. 2010)
- Children: 2
- Relatives: Benji Madden (twin brother); Cameron Diaz (sister-in-law); Lionel Richie (father-in-law)
- Musical career
- Origin: La Plata, Maryland, U.S.
- Genres: Pop-punk; pop rock; punk rock; alternative rock
- Instrument: Vocals
- Member of: Good Charlotte; The Madden Brothers
- Website: goodcharlotte.com

Joel Rueben Madden (né Combs; born March 11, 1979) is an American singer, best known as the lead vocalist for the rock band Good Charlotte. He is also part of the pop rock collaboration the Madden Brothers with his twin brother, Benji.

== Early life ==
Joel Rueben Combs was born in Waldorf, Maryland on March 11, 1979, to Robin Madden and Roger Combs (d. 2019). He has an identical twin, Benji Madden, who plays guitar and sings backing vocals in their band, Good Charlotte. He also has an older brother named Josh Madden who also works in the music industry, and a younger sister named Sarah Madden. Madden attended La Plata High School in La Plata, Maryland.

== Career ==
=== Good Charlotte ===
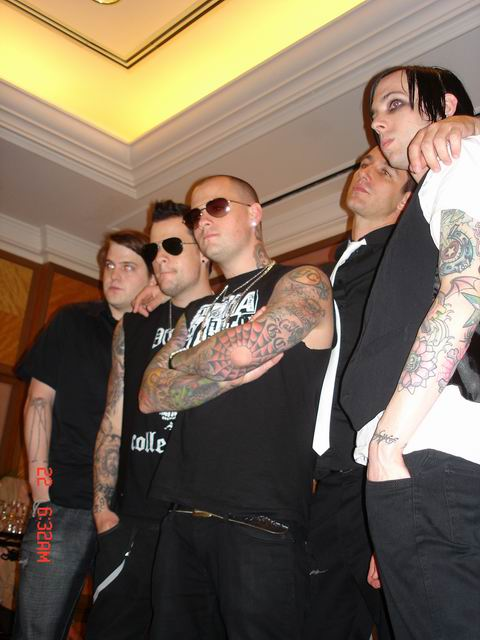
From left to right: Paul Thomas, Joel Madden, Benji Madden, Dean Butterworth, and Billy Martin

In 1995, at the age of 16, Madden, his brother Benji, and a friend started their own band. The band was short-lived and the Maddens eventually recruited fellow high schoolers Paul Thomas, Aaron Escolopio, and Billy Martin to form their band Good Charlotte. They took the name Good Charlotte from the children's book Good Charlotte: Girls of the Good Day Orphanage by Carol Beach York.

=== Other projects ===
In the 2001 film Not Another Teen Movie, Madden and the other Good Charlotte members made a cameo appearance as the band at the school's prom. He later had a cameo role in the 2004 film Fat Albert and in the 2006 film Material Girls with his brother Benji. He also had a guest appearance in the hit Nickelodeon musical comedy series The Naked Brothers Band, in which he joined the band for a performance.

Madden started a clothing line called MADE Clothing along with his brothers Benji and Josh. The line is now defunct. In early 2006 MADE Clothing became DCMA Collective. The line is owned by Joel, his brothers Benji Madden, Josh Madden, and friend Tal Cooperman. The Madden brothers also front a production team called Dead Executives.

In November 2007, Nicole Richie and Madden created The Richie Madden Children's Foundation. The charity will create and promote an online registry to inspire the purchases of items for moms and their families in need. He is also a UNICEF Goodwill Ambassador. In 2010, with his brother, Madden contributed to "We Are the World 25 for Haiti," a remake of the song "We Are the World" by USA for Africa, written by Michael Jackson and Lionel Richie.

On November 23, 2011, Madden was confirmed as one of the four vocal coaches in the first season of the Australian version of the reality singing competition The Voice. His brother, Benji Madden was later his mentor on the show. Joel continued on as a coach in seasons two and three with Benji joining Joel as a coach on seasons 4 & 5 in 2015 and 2016. Because of his commitments to The Voice Australia, he relocated to Sydney.

Madden is featured in Blood on the Dance Floor's fifth studio album on the track "Incomplete and All Alone" released on June 19, 2012. The track was available for free download with pre-orders of the album.

In 2012, Madden joined the 11th annual Independent Music Awards judging panel to assist independent musicians' careers.

In 2013, Madden also provided songwriting and production assistance to the Australian band 5 Seconds of Summer on their first album. He has also helped write songs with them again for their later album Sounds Good Feels Good.

Madden was featured in Alex Kunnari & Heikki L's single "City of Sin", released on July 12, 2013.

Madden was in a pop rock duo with his brother Benji called The Madden Brothers. They released the record Greetings from California, on September 16, 2014. The album title Greetings from California comes from a conversation that the brothers had over breakfast one morning where they were reminiscing over how far they had come since the days of making music in their bedrooms.

In 2015, Madden appeared as guest in the American TV series Empire. He also co-founded the companies MDDN in the same year and Veeps in 2017.

=== The Voice Australia ===
From the beginning of the show in 2012 to 2014, he was a solo coach on The Voice Australia. He teamed up with his brother Benji for The Voice Kids in 2014 and on the main series in 2015 and 2016. In 2013, Joel won the Logie Award for Most Popular New Male Talent for his role as coach on the program.

=== Ink Master ===
Beginning in 2022, Madden has served as the host of Ink Master, replacing Dave Navarro starting with the fourteenth season.

== Personal life ==
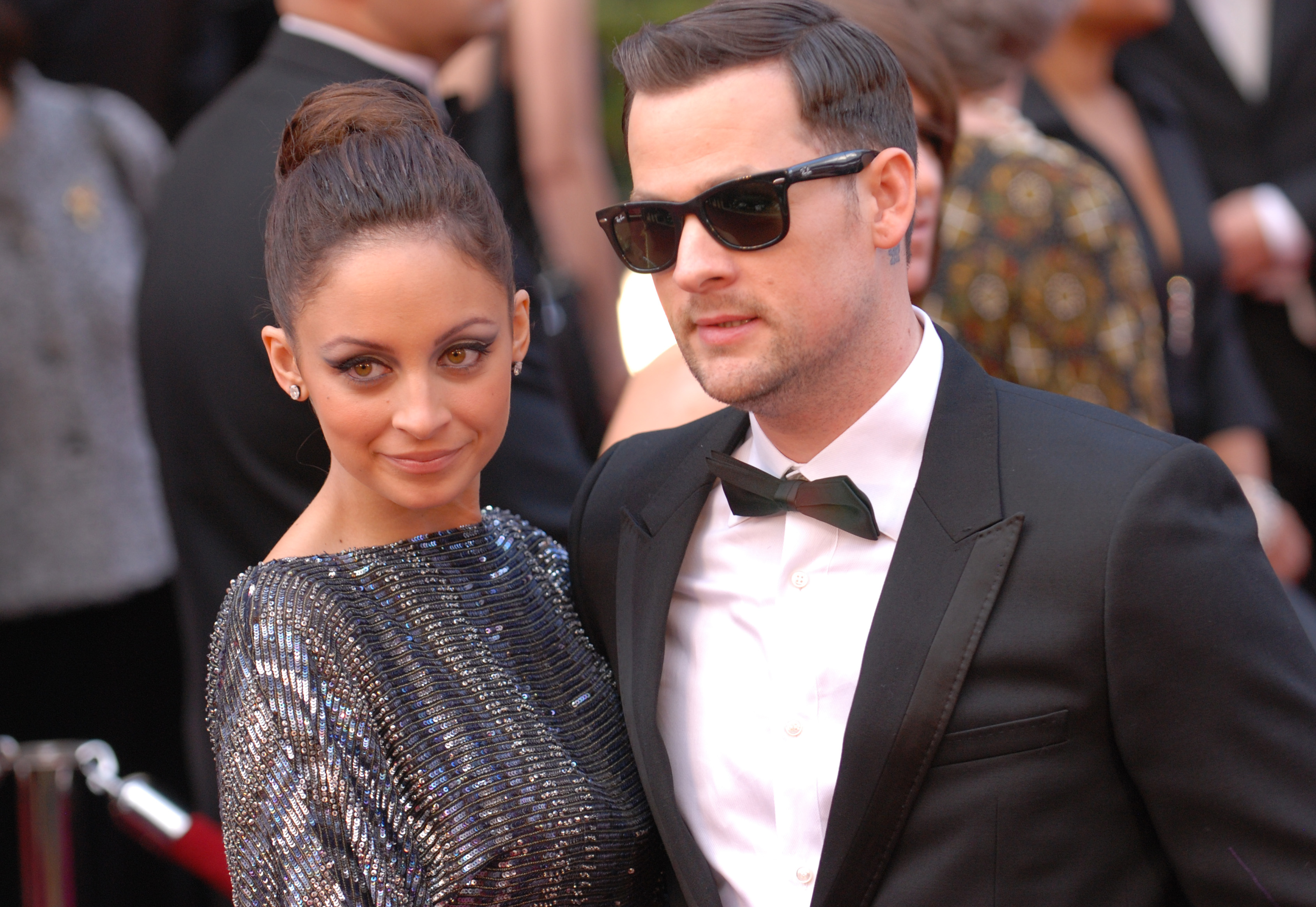
Madden with Nicole Richie in 2010

In July 2004, 25-year-old Madden began dating teen idol Hilary Duff when she was 16. After a long period of tabloid speculation, Duff's mother Susan announced their relationship in a June 2005 interview for Seventeen. In November 2006, Madden and Duff broke up. Writing for Paper in 2015, Abby Schreiber noted that this and similar instances of famous men dating teenage girls had largely been ignored or even defended by tabloids at the time, something she attributed to changing public attitudes as well as tabloids and publicists having more control of information prior to the rise of social media.

Madden started dating Nicole Richie in December 2006. They have two children: a daughter born in 2008 and a son born in 2009. The couple confirmed their engagement in February 2010, and married on December 11, 2010. Madden has residences in both Los Angeles and Sydney, Australia. Good Charlotte were particularly popular in Australia, and Madden has since labelled the country his "home away from home."

Madden has a trademark habit of chewing toothpicks to help reduce the number of cigarettes he smokes a day.

Madden is a Christian. He was raised as a Pentecostal in the Church of God denomination.

== Discography ==
=== with Good Charlotte ===
- Good Charlotte (2000)
- The Young and the Hopeless (2002)
- The Chronicles of Life and Death (2004)
- Good Morning Revival (2007)
- Greatest Remixes (2008)
- Cardiology (2010)
- Youth Authority (2016)
- Generation Rx (2018)
- Motel Du Cap (2025)

=== with The Madden Brothers ===
- Before – Volume One (2011)
- Greetings from California (2014)

=== Guest appearances ===
Year	Song	Artist(s)	Album
2015	"Bail Me Out" (featuring Joel Madden)	All Time Low	Future Hearts
2013	"City of Sin" (featuring Joel Madden)	Alex Kunnari & Heikki L	
2012	"Incomplete And All Alone" (featuring Joel Madden)	Blood on the Dance Floor	Evolution
2011	"Lost" (featuring Joel Madden)	Chae Hawk	
2010	"Auto-Tune the News #11 – Pure Poppycock." (featuring Joel Madden)	The Gregory Brothers	
2009	"Sulla Mia Pelle"	Lost	Sospeso
2008	"Workin'"	Young Dre The Truth	
2008	"Elevator"	Junior Sanchez	
2008	"My Own Way"/"My Own Way" (Remix)	Three 6 Mafia	Last 2 Walk
2008	"I'm the One"	Bizzy Bone	A Song for You
2008	"LA Girls"	Mams Taylor	
2007	"No More Cryin'"	J-Kwon	
2007	"Blockstar"	J-Kwon	
2005	"Tired"	Tommy Lee	Tommyland: The Ride
2005	"Let's Go"	X-Ecutioners	
2004	"Are You Ready?"	Hazen Street	Hazen Street
2004	"All That"	Hazen Street	Hazen Street
2004	"Jump"	N*E*R*D	Fly or Die
2002	"You Don't Mean Anything"	Simple Plan	No Pads, No Helmets...Just Balls

== Filmography ==
Year	Title	Role	Notes
2022–present	Ink Master	Host/Judge	Season 14–present; Competition show
