= Knoke =

Knoke is a German surname. Notable people with the surname include:

- Gary Knoke (1942–1984), Australian track and field athlete
- Heinz Knoke (1921–1993), German fighter pilot

== See also ==
- Knaack, Knaak, Knaake, Knack, Knacke, Knak, Knake, Knoke, Knoche, Knocke
