= Knoch =

Knoch and Knoche are variants of a Germanic family name. Notable people with the surname include:

== Knoch ==
- Adolph Ernst Knoch, founder of the Concordant Publishing Concern and lead translator of the Concordant Version of the Bible
- August Wilhelm Knoch (1742–1818), a German naturalist
- Hubertus "Bertus" Knoch, aka Barry Prima, an Indonesian actor and martial artist
- Balázs Knoch, Hungarian speed skater
- Lucy Knoch (born 1932/1923), American actress
- Viktor Knoch (born 1989), Hungarian speed skater*Winfred George Knoch (May 24, 1895 – May 23, 1983), United States federal judge
- Winfred George Knoch (1895–1983), American judge
- Yasmin Knoch, better known as Yasmin K., German singer

== Knoche ==
- E. Henry Knoche, American intelligence officer
- Chris Knoche, American basketball coach
- Gottfried Knoche, German doctor and surgeon
- Grace F. Knoche (February 15, 1909 – February 18, 2006 ), leader of the Theosophical Society
- Grant Knoche, American musician and performer
- Michael Knoche (born 1951), Germanist and librarian
- Robin Knoche, German football player

== See also ==
- Knaack, Knaak, Knaake, Knack, Knacke, Knak, Knake, Knoch, Knoche, Knocke, Knoke

=== German Wikipedia ===
- de:Knoch
- de:Knoche
- de:von Knoch
- de:von Knoche
