= Nacke =

Nacke is a surname which may refer to:

- Bernhard Nacke, alias of German racing driver Günther Bechem (1921–2011)
- Frances Nacke Noel (1873–1963), née Nacke, German-born American women's labor activist and suffragette
- Heinz Nacke, Luftwaffe Hauptmann who received the Knight's Cross to the Iron Cross in 1940
- Jens Nacke (born 1970), German politician
- Lou Nacke (1959–2001), passenger who attempted to retake United 93 on September 11, 2001
- Paul Näcke (1851–1913), German psychiatrist and criminologist
- Rudolf Nacke, Luftwaffe Stabsfeldwebel who received the Knight's Cross to the Iron Cross in 1941
- Stefan Nacke (born 1976), German politician

== See also ==
- Knacke (disambiguation)
- Knake (disambiguation)
- Nake (disambiguation)
