= KNAK =

KNAK may refer to:

- KNAK (AM), a radio station (540 AM) licensed to serve Delta, Utah, United States
- KNAK-LP, a radio station (97.1 FM) licensed to serve Naknek, Alaska, United States
- KZNS (AM), a radio station (1280 AM) licensed to serve Salt Lake City, Utah, which held the call sign KNAK from 1945 to 1976

== See also ==
- Knak
- Knake (disambiguation)
- Knack (disambiguation)
- NAC (disambiguation)
- Nak (disambiguation)
- Naq (disambiguation)
- WNAK (disambiguation); including callsign W-NAK
