= Knack =

Knack or The Knack may refer to:

== Music and entertainment ==
- The Knack, an American pop-rock band famous for their hit "My Sharona"
- The Knack (1960s US band), an American garage rock band active in the 1960s
- The Knack (UK band), a British freakbeat and psychedelic rock band
- "The Knack" (Dilbert), a 1999 television episode
- The Knack ...and How to Get It, a 1965 British film
- Knack Productions, a Japanese animation studio that created the series The Adventures of the Little Prince and others

== Games ==
- Knack (card game), Swedish gambling card game
- Knack (video game), a launch title developed by SCE Japan Studio for the Sony PlayStation 4

== Other ==
- Knäck, Swedish Christmas Butterscotch
- Knack (magazine), a Belgian news magazine
- Knack (surname)

== See also ==
- 4312 Knacke, a main-belt asteroid
- Knäcke or crispbread
- Knacker, a person in the trade of rendering animals, and slang derived from the term
- Knacker (band), a Canadian indie rock band
- Knick Knack (disambiguation)
- Knick (disambiguation)
- NAC (disambiguation)
- Nach (disambiguation)
- Nack (disambiguation)
- Nak (disambiguation)
- Nakh (disambiguation)
- Naq (disambiguation)
