= Reinhold Knacke =

German fighter ace and Knight's Cross recipient (1919–1943)

- Knacke c. 1939-1943
- Born: 1 January 1919; Strelitz Alt, Free State of Mecklenburg-Strelitz, German Empire
- Died: 3 February 1943 (aged 24); Achterveld, German-occupied Netherlands
- Cause of death: Killed in action
- Burial place: Ysselsteyn, Netherlands (Block M—Row 4—Grave 80)
- Military career
- Allegiance: Nazi Germany
- Branch: Luftwaffe
- Service years: 1937–1943
- Rank: Hauptmann (captain)
- Unit: NJG 1
- Commands: 1./NJG 1
- Conflicts: See battles World War II: Battle of France; Defense of the Reich †
- Awards: Knight's Cross of the Iron Cross with Oak Leaves

Reinhold Knacke (German pronunciation: [ˈʁaɪnhɔlt ˈknakə]; 1 January 1919 – 3 February 1943) was a German Luftwaffe military aviator during World War II, a night fighter ace credited with 44 aerial victories, plus one unconfirmed claim by day, achieved in approximately 160 combat missions making him one of the more successful night fighter pilots in the Luftwaffe. (Note: For a list of Luftwaffe night fighter aces see List of German World War II night fighter aces.) All of his victories were claimed over the Western Front in Defense of the Reich missions against Royal Air Force Bomber Command.

Born in Strelitz, Knacke grew up in the Weimar Republic and Nazi Germany. He joined the Luftwaffe in 1937 and was trained as a pilot. He served with Zerstörergeschwader 1 (ZG 1—1st Destroyer Wing), flying a Messerschmitt Bf 110 heavy fighter, at the start of World War II. He claimed his first aerial victory during the Battle of France which was not confirmed. In June 1940, the Luftwaffe created its first night fighter wing, Nachtjagdgeschwader 1 (NJG 1—1st Night Fighter Wing), and Knacke transferred to this unit. There, he claimed his first nocturnal aerial victory on the night of 9 March 1940. Knacke was appointed squadron leader of 1. Staffel (1st squadron) of NJG 1 in April 1942. On 1 July 1942, he was awarded the Knight's Cross of the Iron Cross after his 23rd aerial victory. At the end of 1942, Knacke was one of the leading night fighter pilots of the Luftwaffe.

On 2/3 February 1943, he shot down a H2S airborne ground scanning radar-equipped bomber, the first such radar system to be recovered and analyzed by German technicians. Later that night, he was killed in action following combat with another RAF bomber. Posthumously, Knacke was awarded the Knight's Cross of the Iron Cross with Oak Leaves on 5 February 1943.

== Early life and career ==
Knacke was born on 1 January 1919 in Strelitz, now Strelitz-Alt, a borough of Neustrelitz, at the time in the Free State of Mecklenburg-Strelitz of the Weimar Republic. He was the son of an employee of the Deutsche Reichsbahn. Knacke volunteered for military service in the Luftwaffe on 1 November 1937 and was trained as a pilot. (Note: Flight training in the Luftwaffe progressed through the levels A1, A2 and B1, B2, referred to as A/B flight training. A training included theoretical and practical training in aerobatics, navigation, long-distance flights and dead-stick landings. The B courses included high-altitude flights, instrument flights, night landings and training to handle the aircraft in difficult situations. For pilots destined to fly multi-engine aircraft, the training was completed with the Luftwaffe Advanced Pilot's Certificate (Erweiterter Luftwaffen-Flugzeugführerschein), also known as the C-Certificate.) On 1 September 1939, he was promoted to Leutnant (second lieutenant) and was posted to I. Gruppe (1st Group) of Zerstörergeschwader 1 (ZG 1—1st Destroyer Wing).

== World War II ==
World War II in Europe had begun on Friday 1 September 1939 with the German Invasion of Poland. In February 1940, I./ZG 1 was placed under the command of Hauptmann (Captain) Wolfgang Falck. With the start of the Norwegian Campaign in April 1940, I./ZG 1 was moved to Aalborg airfield. There, the airfield came under night attacks by Royal Air Force (RAF) Bomber Command, leading Falck to conduct his first experiments of nocturnal aerial combat. During the Battle of France, Knacke claimed an unconfirmed aerial victory on 10 May 1940 over a Bristol Blenheim bomber in the vicinity of Waalhaven. Flying numerous combat missions during this campaign, he was awarded the Iron Cross 2nd Class (Eisernes Kreuz 2. Klasse), which was presented to him on 15 July 1940 and was promoted to Oberleutnant (first lieutenant) on 1 October 1940.

=== Night fighter career ===
A map of part of the Kammhuber Line. The 'belt' and night fighter 'boxes' are shown.

Following the 1939 aerial Battle of the Heligoland Bight, RAF attacks shifted to the cover of darkness, initiating the Defence of the Reich campaign. By mid-1940, Generalmajor (Brigadier-General) Josef Kammhuber had established a night air defense system dubbed the Kammhuber Line. It consisted of a series of control sectors equipped with radars and searchlights and an associated night fighter. Each sector, named a Himmelbett (canopy bed), would direct the night fighter into visual range of a bomber. In 1941, the Luftwaffe started equipping night fighters with airborne radar such as the Lichtenstein. This airborne radar did not come into general use until early 1942.

Following the Battle of France, Falck was ordered to establish the first Luftwaffe night fighter wing, Nachtjagdgeschwader 1 (NJG 1—1st Night Fighter Wing). His former unit, I./ZG 1 formed the nucleus of I. Gruppe of NJG 1 which was placed under the command of Oberleutnant Werner Streib. Now flying in the 2. Staffel of NJG 1, sources vary with respect to when Knacke claimed his first nocturnal aerial victory. According to Foreman, Parry and Mathews, he claimed a Vickers Wellington bomber shot down on 9 March 1941. According to Obermaier and Stockert, Knacke was credited with his first aerial victory on the night of 2/3 May 1941. He received the German Cross in Gold (Deutsches Kreuz in Gold) on 14 April 1942, after his 18th claim.

=== Squadron leader and death ===
Knacke was appointed Staffelkapitän (squadron leader) of 1. Staffel (1st Squadron) of NJG 1 on 1 April 1942. On 25/26 June 1942, RAF Bomber Command launched the third thousand-bomber raid and bombed Bremen. That night, Knacke, assisted by his radio operator Unteroffizier Günther Heu, claimed three aerial victories. On the night of 25/26 July 1942, Knacke shot down a Bristol Blenheim bomber R3837 from 114 Squadron on its intruder bombing mission to Venlo airfield. Three nights later, Knacke became the first German night fighter pilot to claim a de Havilland Mosquito destroyed. The aircraft, Mosquito DD677 from 23 Squadron, was shot down near Haps. On 16/17 September 1942, 369 British bombers attacked Germany, losing 39 of their number, a very high 10.6 percent loss rate. Knacke, shot down five bombers that night, which made him an "ace-in-a-day". (Note: These five aerial victories are not documented by Foreman, Parry and Mathews, authors of Luftwaffe Night Fighter Claims 1939 – 1945.) At the end of 1942, Knacke was one of the leading night fighter pilots of the Luftwaffe, which at the time included Lent (49 nocturnal claims), Ludwig Becker (40 nocturnal claims), Werner Streib (39 nocturnal claims) and Paul Gildner (37 nocturnal claims). He was promoted to Hauptmann on 1 January 1943.

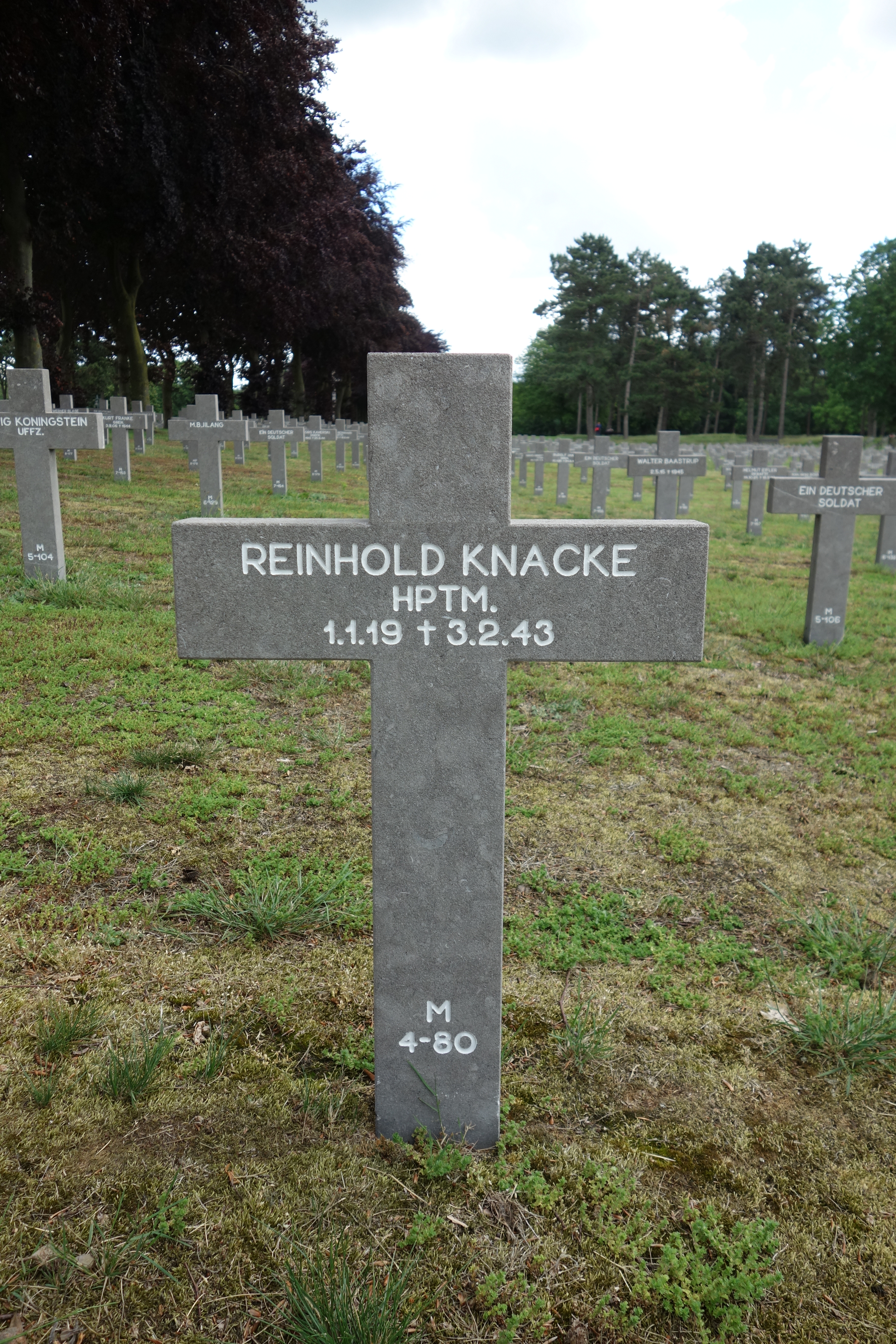
German War Cemetery Ysselsteyn - Reinhold Knacke

On the night of 2/3 February 1943, Knacke shot down a Short Stirling bomber on its mission to bomb Cologne. The Stirling I R9264 MG-L from 7 Squadron was a Pathfinder aircraft equipped with the new H2S airborne ground scanning radar. The radar was recovered by German forces and sent to Berlin where it was examined by Telefunken. Knacke then attacked a Halifax bomber near Achterveld which he shot down but his aircraft was also hit by one of the bomber air gunners. The radio operator, Unteroffizier Kurt Bundrock, managed to bail out from the burning aircraft. Knacke was found dead next to his crashed Bf 110 F-4 (Werksnummer 4683—factory number) "G9+DK" 3 km (1.9 mi) east of Achterveld. Knacke was posthumously awarded the Knight's Cross of the Iron Cross with Oak Leaves (Ritterkreuz des Eisernen Kreuzes mit Eichenlaub) on 5 February 1943. He was the 190th member of the German armed forces to be so honored. Originally buried near Deelen airfield, he was reinterred at the German War Cemetery Ysselsteyn (Block M—Row 4—Grave 80) at Venray.

== Summary of career ==
=== Aerial victory claims ===
According to Aders, Knacke was credited with 44 nocturnal aerial victories. Foreman, Parry and Mathews, authors of Luftwaffe Night Fighter Claims 1939 – 1945, researched the German Federal Archives and found records for 45 nocturnal victory claims. Mathews and Foreman also published Luftwaffe Aces — Biographies and Victory Claims, listing Knacke with 43 nocturnal aerial victories claims, plus one further unconfirmed claim as a destroyer pilot during day operations.

Victory claims were logged to a map-reference (PQ = Planquadrat), for example "PQ 6255". The Luftwaffe grid map (Jägermeldenetz) covered Europe, western Russia and North Africa and was composed of rectangles measuring 15 minutes of latitude by 30 minutes of longitude, an area of about 360 sq mi (930 km^{2}). These sectors were divided into 36 smaller units to give a location area 3 km × 4 km (1.9 mi × 2.5 mi) in size.

Chronicle of aerial victories
This and the – (dash) indicates unwitnessed aerial victory claims for which Knacke did not receive credit. This and the ? (question mark) indicates discrepancies between Luftwaffe Night Fighter Claims 1939 – 1945 and Luftwaffe Aces — Biographies and Victory Claims.
Claim (total)	Claim (nocturnal)	Date	Time	Type	Location	Serial No./Squadron No.
– 3. Staffel of Zerstörergeschwader 1 –
—		10 May 1940	12:00	Blenheim	Waalhaven	
– 2. Staffel of Nachtjagdgeschwader 1 –
1? (Note: This claim is not listed in Luftwaffe Aces — Biographies and Victory Claims.)	1	9 March 1941	05:50	Wellington		
2?	2	10 March 1941	23:42	Stirling		
3?	3	13 March 1941	22:50	Wellington		
4	4	10 May 1941	04:13	Wellington	4 km (2.5 mi) west of Weert	
5	5	10 May 1941	03:05	Whitley	8 km (5.0 mi) west of Weert	
6	6	13 June 1941	03:16	Whitley	Aalst	Whitley Z6489 from 102 Squadron
7	7	17 June 1941	02:31	Wellington	10 km (6.2 mi) northwest of Weert	
8	8	3 July 1941	01:03	Whitley	8 km (5.0 mi) southwest of Maastricht	
9	9	3 July 1941	01:12	Hampden	6 km (3.7 mi) northeast of Maastricht	
10	10	8 July 1941	01:17	Hampden	Houthem	
11	11	8 July 1941	01:25	Wellington	Maastricht	
12	12	14 October 1941	06:00	Whitley	Lommel	
13	13	15 October 1941	21:37	Wellington		
14	14	27 December 1941	20:24	Wellington	5 km (3.1 mi) east of Heeze	
15	15	10 March 1942	23:42	Stirling		
16	16	13 March 1942	22:50	Wellington		
17	17	28 March 1942	23:31	Manchester	northwest of Vlieland	
18	18	10 April 1942	22:58	Hampden	10 km (6.2 mi) east of Enkhuizen	
– Stab I. Gruppe of Nachtjagdgeschwader 1 –
19	19	31 May 1942	01:00	Wellington	10 km (6.2 mi) east of Weert	
20	20	31 May 1942	02:04	Halifax	3 km (1.9 mi) east-southeast of Weert	Halifax L9605 from 1652 Conversion Unit RAF
21	21	31 May 1942	02:30	Wellington	3 km (1.9 mi) southwest of Middelbeers	
22	22	17 June 1942	02:28	Halifax	west of Veldhoven	
23	23	17 June 1942	04:20	Wellington	2 km (1.2 mi) northeast of Ouddorp	
24	24	22 July 1942	01:49	Wellington	8 km (5.0 mi) southeast of Eindhoven	Wellington X3561 KO-X from No. 115 Squadron RAF
25	25	22 July 1942	02:06	Wellington	11 km (6.8 mi) east of Eindhoven	Wellington X3750 KO-B from 115 Squadron
26	26	26 July 1942	01:19	Blenheim	Schandeloo	Blenheim IV R3837 from No. 114 Squadron RAF
27	27	26 July 1942	01:31	Stirling	3 km (1.9 mi) north of Horst	Stirling I W7576 from No. 15 Squadron RAF
28	28	26 July 1942	01:50	Wellington	Repelen	
29	29	29 July 1942	01:10	Mosquito	Haps	Mosquito DD677 from 23 Squadron
– 1. Staffel of Nachtjagdgeschwader 1 –
30	30	6 August 1942	01:06	Wellington	Hau	
31	31	7 August 1942	02:42	Stirling	500 metres (1,600 feet) south of Hötheim	
32	32	7 August 1942	02:57	Wellington	5 km (3.1 mi) northeast of 's-Hertogenbosch	
33	33	10 August 1942	03:07	Wellington	northeast of Doetinchem	
34	34	10 August 1942	03:52	Halifax	8 km (5.0 mi) northwest of Helmond	
35	35	16 August 1942	03:26	Halifax	2.5 kilometres (1.6 miles) east of Kevelar	
36	36	2 October 1942	21:40	Halifax	PQ 6255	
37	37	15 October 1942	21:50	Lancaster	PQ 6272	
38	38	20 December 1942	19:45	Halifax	PQ 6235	
39	39	20 December 1942	20:19	Wellington	PQ 5213	
40	40	21 December 1942	24:00	Lancaster	10 km (6.2 mi) northeast of Oss/Brabant	
41	41	31 December 1942	20:15	Lancaster	10 km (6.2 mi) east of Oss	
42	42	4 January 1943	20:19	Lancaster	5 km (3.1 mi) south of Maastricht	Lancaster W4274 from No. 460 Squadron RAAF
43	43	27 January 1943	20:10	Lancaster	12 km (7.5 mi) south-southwest of Nijmegen	
44	44	3 February 1943	19:46	Stirling	12 km (7.5 mi) south of Amerongen	
45	45	3 February 1943	20:05	Halifax	north-northwest of Thiel	Stirling R9197 from 214 (Federated Malay States) Squadron

=== Awards ===
- Iron Cross (1939)
  - 2nd Class (15 July 1940)
  - 1st Class (1940)
- German Cross in Gold on 14 April 1942 as Oberleutnant in the 2./Nachtjagdgeschwader 1
- Knight's Cross of the Iron Cross with Oak Leaves
  - Knight's Cross on 1 July 1942 as Oberleutnant and pilot in the 3./Nachtjagdgeschwader 1
  - 190th Oak Leaves on 7 February 1943 as Hauptmann and Staffelkapitän of the 3./Nachtjagdgeschwader 1 (Note: According to Scherzer on 5 February 1943.)
