= Knoch (disambiguation) =

Knoch is a surname.

Knoch may also refer to:

- Knoch Knolls Park, in Naperville, Illinois
- Knoch, the longest road within Roscommon State Forest Area, Michigan
- Knoch High School in the South Butler County School District in Saxonburg, Pennsylvania
- Knoch School District, Saxonburg, Pennsylvania
- Knoch Cemetery, in Morgan Township, Coles County, Illinois
