= Frances Noel =

Frances Noel may refer to:

- Frances Nacke Noel, women's labor activist and suffragette
- Frances Noel, Countess of Gainsborough, Lady of the Bedchamber to Queen Victoria
