= Dettmann (surname) =

Dettmann is a surname. Notable people with the surname include:

- Julius Dettmann (1894–1945), German SS officer, deporter of Anne Frank
- Henrik Dettmann (born 1958), Finnish basketball coach
- Ludwig Dettmann (1865–1944), German painter
- Marcel Dettmann (born 1977), German musical artist
- Tim Dettmann (born 1982), German badminton player
