= Little Things (Good Charlotte song) =

2000 single by Good Charlotte

Single by Good Charlotte

from the album Good Charlotte
- B-side: "The Click"; "Thank You Mom"
- Released: July 24, 2000
- Length: 3:23
- Label: Epic
- Songwriters: Benji Madden; Joel Madden
- Producer: Don Gilmore

Good Charlotte singles chronology
"Little Things" (2000)	"The Motivation Proclamation" (2001)

Music video
- "Little Things" on YouTube

"Little Things" is a song by American band Good Charlotte from their self-titled debut album. The song was released as their debut single on July 24, 2000. It peaked at number 23 on the US Billboard Modern Rock Tracks chart and number 61 in Australia.

== Music video ==
The music video shows the band performing in a high school. It was directed by Nigel Dick and was filmed between July 17 and 18, 2000, at Lorne Park Secondary School in Mississauga, Ontario, Canada. Mandy Moore appears in the video.

== Track listing ==
1. "Little Things" – 3:24
2. "The Click" – 3:36
3. "Thank You Mom" – 3:53

== Charts ==
Weekly chart performance for "Little Things"
Chart (2001)	Peak position
Australia (ARIA)	61
US Alternative Airplay (Billboard)	23

== Certifications ==
Certifications for "Little Things"
Region	Certification	Certified units/sales
United States (RIAA)	Gold	500,000^{‡}
^{‡} Sales+streaming figures based on certification alone.
