= The Motivation Proclamation =

2001 single by Good Charlotte

Single by Good Charlotte

from the album Good Charlotte
- B-side: "If You Leave"; "Let Me Go"
- Released: January 29, 2001
- Studio: Encore (Los Angeles)
- Length: 3:36
- Label: Epic
- Songwriters: Benji Madden; Joel Madden
- Producer: Don Gilmore

Good Charlotte singles chronology
"Little Things" (2000)	"The Motivation Proclamation" (2001)	"Festival Song" (2001)

Music video
- "The Motivation Proclamation" on YouTube

"The Motivation Proclamation" is a song by American rock band Good Charlotte. Vocalist Joel Madden and lead guitarist Benji Madden wrote the song while Don Gilmore produced it. The track, whose lyrics talking about moving on from distressing routines, was included on the band's self-titled debut album (2000).

Although "The Motivation Proclamation'" received some airplay in the United States, it did not chart. In August 2001, Epic Records issued a CD single in Australia. While the song stalled at number 67 in Australia, it became a top-30 hit in New Zealand, where it peaked at number 28. A music video directed by Marc Webb was made for the song, featuring the band waking up and performing the song together.

== Background and release ==
According to guitarist Billy Martin, "The Motivation Proclamation" is about "breaking out of a cycle if you're depressed on something... getting over it and going on". In the United States, the song was serviced to alternative radio on January 29, 2001, but it did not appear on any Billboard rankings. In Australia and New Zealand, a CD single was issued. In the former country, the song was released on August 6, 2001, and debuted at number 78 on the ARIA Singles Chart the following week. It spent two more weeks on the chart before dropping out. After Good Charlotte entered the top 100 on the ARIA Albums Chart, the song re-entered the top 100 at number 67, its peak, in mid-October. In New Zealand, the track entered the RIANZ Singles Chart at number 44 on September 6, 2001, and peaked at number 28 on October 21, 2001, spending 15 weeks in the top 50.

== Music video ==
Marc Webb directed the song's music video. In the clip, the band members are initially asleep. As the song progresses, each member wakes up and begins to play their instrument in the same room. Throughout the video, shots of a television airing American-Canadian adult animated sitcom Undergrads are sporadically shown. The video was added to the playlists of MTV and MTV2 in March 2001.

== Track listing ==
Australian and New Zealand CD single

1. "The Motivation Proclamation"
2. "If You Leave"
3. "Let Me Go"

== Credits and personnel ==
Credits are lifted from the Australian CD single liner notes and the Good Charlotte album booklet.

Studios

- Recorded, engineered, and mixed at Encore Studios (Los Angeles)
- Mastered at Sony Music Studios (New York City)

Personnel

- Benji Madden – writing
- Joel Madden – writing
- Jimi HaHa – additional vocals
- Don Gilmore – production, engineering, mixing
- John Ewing Jr. – additional engineering, Pro Tools
- Vlado Meller – mastering

== Charts ==
Chart (2001)	Peak position
Australia (ARIA)	67
New Zealand (Recorded Music NZ)	28
