= Nakh =

Nakh may refer to:

- Nach (Bible acronym) (NaKh), an acronym for Nevi'im Ksuvim/Ktuvim (the Prophets and (Holy) Writings of Tanach)
- Nakh languages, a group of languages within Northeast Caucasian, spoken chiefly by the Chechens and Ingush in the North Caucasus within Southern Russia
- Nakh peoples, the group of peoples who speak the Nakh languages
- Nakh Mountain, Hormozgan, Iran; a mountain

== See also ==
- Nach (disambiguation)
- Knack (disambiguation)
- Nack (disambiguation)
- NAC (disambiguation)
- Nak (disambiguation)
- Naq (disambiguation)
