= Lisa Knack =

German politician (born 1986)

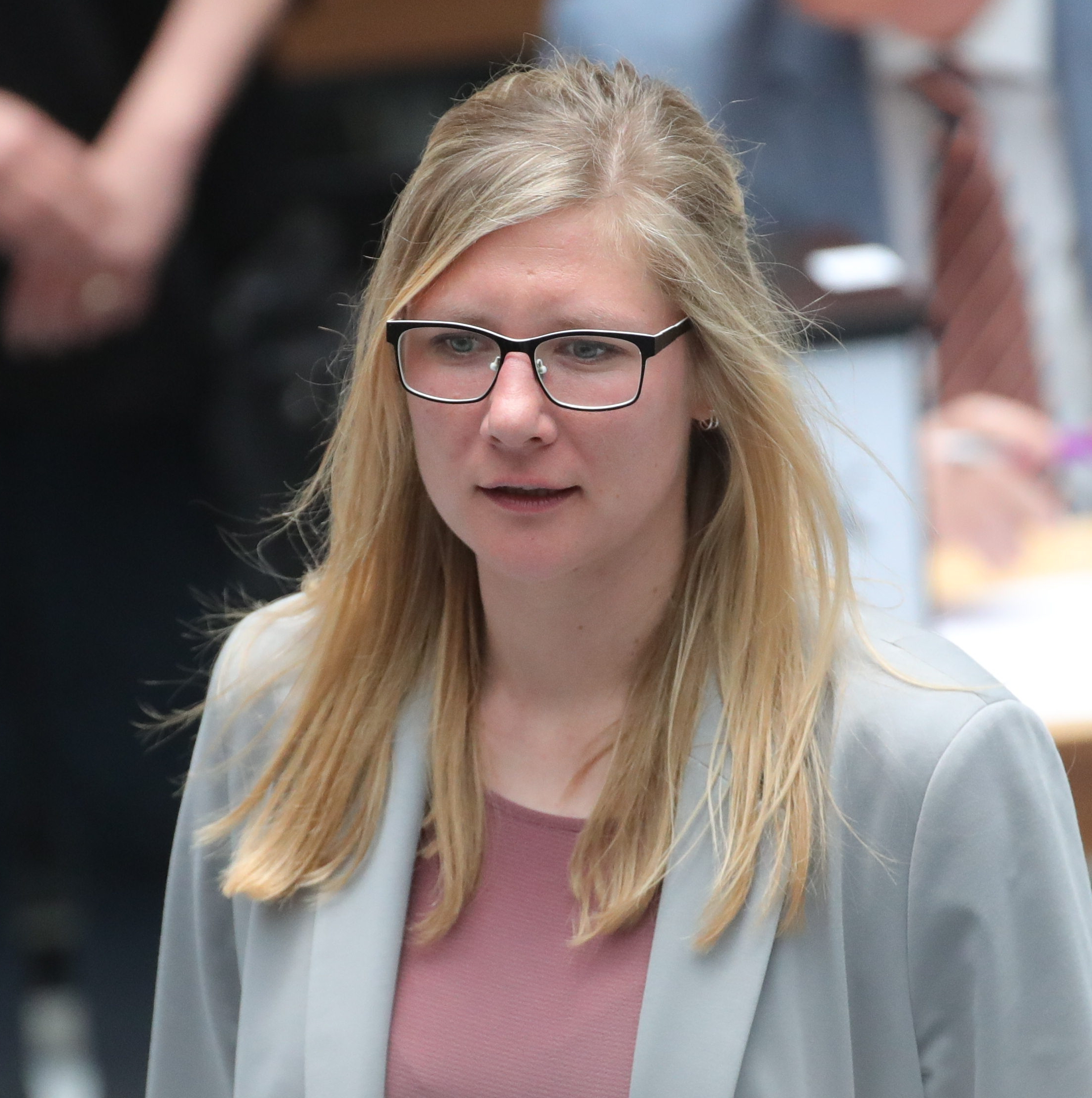
- Knack in 2023

Member of the Berlin House of Representatives
- Incumbent
- Assumed office 16 March 2023
- Preceded by: Robert Schaddach
- Constituency: Treptow-Köpenick 4

Personal details
- Born: 1986 (age 39–40)
- Party: Christian Democratic Union

Lisa-Bettina Knack (born 1986) is a German politician serving as a member of the Berlin House of Representatives since 2023. She is the queer policy spokesperson of the Christian Democratic Union group in the House.
