= Knaak =

Knaak is a German surname. Notable people with the surname include:

- Delores J. Knaak (1929–2020), American educator and politician
- Fritz Knaak (born 1953), American lawyer and politician
- Peter Knaak (born 1942), Canadian politician
- Rainer Knaak (born 1953), German Chess Grandmaster
- Rebecca Knaak (born 1996), German footballer
- Richard A. Knaak (born 1961), American novelist
- Turid Knaak (born 1991), German footballer
- Will Knaak (born 1984), American guitarist and singer-songwriter

== See also ==
- Knaack, Knaak, Knaake, Knack, Knacke, Knak, Knake
