= WNAK =

WNAK (W-NAK) may refer to:

- WAZL (AM), radio station 730 AM in Nanticoke, Pennsylvania, USA; formerly WNAK prior to 2010
- WTRW, radio station 95.3 FM in Carbondale, Pennsylvania, USA; formerly WNAK-FM (2004-2006)

== See also ==
- Nak (disambiguation)
- KNAK (disambiguation), callsign K-NAK
