= NAC =

NAC may refer to:

== Arts ==
- National Arts Centre, Canada
- National Arts Club, New York, United States
- National Arts Council, Singapore, a statutory board of the Singapore government
- Narodowe Archiwum Cyfrowe, Polish National Digital Archives
- New adult contemporary, a name once used for the smooth jazz radio format

== Aviation ==
- NAC Air, a former Native owned air carrier, Canada
- NAC Fieldmaster, British agricultural aircraft
- NAC, the IATA code for Naracoorte Airport in South Australia, Australia
- Namibia Airports Company, operator of eight airports in Namibia
- National Air Communications, a British government organisation 1939–1940
- National Airways Corporation (South Africa), a South African commercial aviation company
- Nauru Air Corporation, the national airline of the Pacific island Republic of Nauru
- Nepal Airlines Corporation, the national airline of Nepal. previously known as RNAC (Royal Nepal Airlines Corporation)
- New Zealand National Airways Corporation, the former national domestic airline of New Zealand
- Northern Air Cargo, a cargo airline based in Anchorage, Alaska, U.S.

== Organisations ==
=== Companies ===
- NAC Architecture, a U.S. design firm
- Nanjing Automobile (Group) Corporation, a Chinese subsidiary of SAIC
- Nickel Asia Corporation, largest producer of nickel ore in the Philippines
- Nordic Aviation Capital, Danish based airline lessor
- North American Communications, a defunct U.S. direct mailer

=== Education ===
- Nakanihon Automotive College, a private junior college in Sakahogi, Gifu, Japan
- National Academy of Construction, an Indian college
- Nowra Anglican College, an Anglican College based in Nowra, Australia
- Nunavut Arctic College, a nursing school in Canada

=== Politics ===
- New Administrative Capital, the new capital center being built to replace Cairo as Egypt's government center
- National Aboriginal Conference, Australian governmental body 1973–1985
- National Administrative Council, former governing body of the Independent Labour Party in the UK
- National Advisory Council, an advisory body set up to monitor the implementation of the UPA government's manifesto in India
- New Agenda Coalition, an international group advocating nuclear disarmament
- North Atlantic Council, the most senior political governing body of NATO
- Nyasaland African Congress, a political party in Malawi

=== Religion ===
- Native American Church, the most widespread indigenous religion among Native Americans
- New Apostolic Church, a chiliastic church
- Pontifical North American College, an American seminary in Rome, Italy

=== Other organizations ===
- National Abortion Campaign, a former UK campaigning group for abortion rights
- National Action Committee on the Status of Women, a Canadian feminist activist organization
- National Agricultural Centre, now renamed Stoneleigh Park, UK

== Media ==
- NAC TV, Neepawa, Manitoba, Canada
- Newspaper Agency Corporation, Salt Lake City, Utah, U.S

== Science and technology ==
=== Medicine ===
- N-Acetylcarnosine, a compound related to carnosine
- N-Acetylcysteine, a medication
- Nucleus accumbens, a region in the brain
- N-Acetyl as in GlcNAc and GalNAc

=== Other science and technology ===
- Natural Area Code, a geocode system
- Network Access Code, for public safety radios
- Network access control
- Network Admission Control
- North Atlantic Current

== Sports ==
=== Netherlands ===
- NAC Basketbal, basketball club based in Breda, Netherland
- NAC Breda, football club from Breda, Netherlands
- NAC Stadion, a multi-use stadium in Breda, Netherlands

=== United States ===
- Nashville Athletic Club, a sports club for young men in Nashville, Tennessee, U.S.
- North Atlantic Conference, a U.S. collegiate athletic conference based in New England, U.S.
- Northern Athletics Conference, former name of the U.S. collegiate athletic conference based in the Midwest U.S.

=== Other places ===
- CA Oradea, football club based in Oradea, Bihor County, Romania
- Nacional Atlético Clube (disambiguation), several Brazilian football teams
- National Aquatic Centre, indoor aquatics facility in Blanchardstown, Dublin, Ireland
- Netherlands Antilles Championship, premier association football competition in the Netherlands Antilles (defunct)
- North America Challenge, a laser tag competition in the US and Canada

== Other uses ==
- Nam Cheong station, of the Mass Transit Railway (MTR), Hong Kong
- Network Access Code is a feature of Project 25 digital radios similar to CTCSS or DCS for analog radios. That is, radios can be programmed to only break squelch when receiving the correct NAC.
- New Atlantic Charter, a 2021 agreement between the UK and US
- North America and the Caribbean, see List of country groupings
- North American Confederacy, a fictional government in the novel The Probability Broach by L. Neil Smith
- Notified Area Council or nagar panchayat, one of the three types of urban system in India

== See also ==
- NACS (disambiguation)
- Knack (disambiguation)
- Nack (disambiguation)
- Nach (disambiguation)
- Nakh (disambiguation)
- Nak (disambiguation)
- naq (disambiguation)
