= Nack (disambiguation) =

Nack is a municipality in Alzey-Worms, Rhineland-Palatinate, Germany.

Nack or variations, may also refer to:

== People ==
- Agathe Ngo Nack (born 1958), Cameroonian athlete
- James M. Nack (1809–1879), U.S. poet
- Katie Nack, mayor of Pasadena, California, USA
- Michel Nack Balokog (born 1986), Cameroonian soccer player
- Milo De Nack, bassist for the band Medusa
- William Nack (1941–2018), U.S. journalist

== Characters ==
- Näck, a water spirit in Swedish mythology
- Nack the Weasel, a fictional character from Sonic the Hedgehog
- Nick Nack, henchman to Bond villain Francisco Scaramanga in the film The Man with the Golden Gun

== Other uses ==
- NACK, acknowledgement in telecom

== See also ==
- FM Nack5, a radio station in Saitama, Japan
- NACK5 Stadium Omiya (Japanese: ナックファイブスタジアム大宮, romanized: Nakku-faibu Sutajiamu Ōmiya), Ōmiya-ku, Saitama City, Saitama Prefecture, Japan; a soccer stadium
- Nick Nack (disambiguation)
- Nach (disambiguation)
- Nakh (disambiguation)
- NAC (disambiguation)
- Nak (disambiguation)
- Naq (disambiguation)
- Knack (disambiguation)
