= Knick Knack (disambiguation) =

Knick Knack or variants may refer to:

- Bric-à-brac, often referred to as "knick knacks"
- Knick Knack, a 1989 American animated short film
- Knickknack, a member of the Captain America villains Death-Throws
- Knickknack Toys, from the film Some Assembly Required
- Nick Nack, a character in the Bond film The Man with the Golden Gun
- "Nick Nack", a song from the 2006 Purple City album The Purple Album
- Knick knack, another name for a Door-knocking prank

== See also ==
- Knack (disambiguation)
- Knick (disambiguation)
- Nick (disambiguation)
- Nack (disambiguation)
- Nikki Nack, a 2014 album by Tune-Yards
- This Old Man, a nursery rhyme that repeats the line "Knickknack Paddywhack" in each verse
