= Naq =

Naq or NAQ may refer to:

== Places ==
- Naque, Minas Gerais, Brazil
- Nouvelle-Aquitaine (NAQ), France
- Qaanaaq Airport, Greenland (IATA:NAQ)

== Social sciences ==
- Khoekhoe language, of southern Africa (ISO 636:naq)
- Negative Acts Questionnaire, a psychological test evaluating mobbing
- Nuclear Attitudes Questionnaire, a sociological survey of nuclear anxiety

== Sport ==
- Charente–Maritime Women Cycling (UCI team code:NAQ)

== See also ==
- Nach (disambiguation)
- Nack (disambiguation)
- Nakh (disambiguation)
- NAC (disambiguation)
- Nak (disambiguation)
- Knack (disambiguation)
