= Nake =

Nake may refer to:

- Nake language
- Frieder Nake (born 1938), mathematician, computer scientist, and computer artist
- Nake M. Kamrany (born 1934), American economist and academic

== See also ==
- Knake (disambiguation)
- Knacke (disambiguation)
- Naked (disambiguation)
