= NAKS (disambiguation) =

NAKS or Naks may refer to:

- NAKS (Na Afrikan Kulturu fu Sranan), a social and cultural organization
- North American Kant Society
- NikNaks (South African snack), a brand of corn extruded snack produced by the Simba Chip company in South Africa
- Nik Naks (British snack), a brand of corn extruded snack produced by KP Snacks in the United Kingdom

== See also ==
- Nak (disambiguation)
