= Good Charlotte (album) =

Studio album by Good Charlotte
- Released: September 26, 2000
- Recorded: May – June 2000
- Studios: Encore, NRG and Larrabee West (Los Angeles, California); Battery (New York City)
- Genre: Pop-punk
- Length: 45:12
- Labels: Epic; Daylight
- Producer: Don Gilmore

Good Charlotte chronology
GC EP (2000)	Good Charlotte (2000)	The Young and the Hopeless (2002)

Singles from Good Charlotte
- 1. "Little Things" Released: July 24, 2000; 2. "The Motivation Proclamation" Released: January 29, 2001; 3. "Festival Song" Released: June 25, 2001

Good Charlotte is the debut album by the American rock band Good Charlotte, released on September 26, 2000, through Epic and Daylight Records. Despite receiving favorable reviews, the album was a commercial disappointment, charting at number 185 on the Billboard 200. The album's first single, "Little Things" reached the top 30 on the Mainstream Top 40 and the Alternative Songs charts.

The band formed in 1996 with twin brothers Joel on vocals and Benji Madden on guitar, along with Billy Martin on guitar, Paul Thomas on bass and Aaron Escolopio on drums. A demo of "Little Things" received airplay from two radio stations and by early 2000, Good Charlotte had signed to Epic Records. Recording sessions with producer Don Gilmore for the debut album took place in four studios in California and New York.

"Little Things" was released as a single in July 2000; its music video for started getting airplay in November 2000. "The Motivation Proclamation" was released as the next single in January 2001. Between March and May 2001, the group went on tour with MxPx and appeared at HFStival, where a music video for "Festival Song" was filmed. After this, Escolopio left the group and was replaced by Nate Foutz of Vroom. Foutz remained with the group for six weeks before Dusty Bill replaced him. "Festival Song" was released a single in June 2001. The group participated in Warped Tour between June and August 2001. The album was subsequently certified silver in the UK and gold in the US.

== Background ==
The band Good Charlotte was formed in Waldorf, Maryland, in 1995, after identical twin brothers Joel (vocals) and Benji Madden (guitar) had seen a Beastie Boys show. Following the brothers' graduation in 1997, instead of going to college they worked full-time on the band. The Madden brothers focused on getting the band signed, reading books and magazines that would aid them to achieve this goal. They made promotional packages and sent them to record labels. Joel Madden learned that the girl he took to homecoming was a sister of bassist Paul Thomas. Thomas met the brothers and was unimpressed with their performance skills. Soon afterwards, the brothers recruited their fellow high-school pupil Aaron Escolopio as a drummer and began playing clubs in the D.C. metro area. The Madden brothers moved to Annapolis, Maryland, and performed acoustic shows.

Guitarist Billy Martin went to one of these shows at the insistence of Jimi HaHa of Jimmie's Chicken Shack. Martin became friends with the Madden brothers and let them move in with him after they were evicted from their apartment. Martin joined Good Charlotte after the trio learned they had a shared interest in the Australian rock band Silverchair and the break up of Martin's band Overflow. They wrote new songs, and recorded and performed demos. The band began building a following by performing at HFStival in 1998, and support slots for Blink-182, Lit and Bad Religion. In 1999, Good Charlotte opened for Save Ferris in Philadelphia. After the performance, they left a demo of "Little Things" that soon got airplay on local radio station Y100. Benji Madden was certain of the song's potential hit status with its high-school theme and the reality of its lyrics.

A Sony Music employee passed the band's demo to regional promotion manager Mike Martinovich, who was impressed by the group's writing ability and the autobiographical nature of the songs. He contacted talent manager Steve Feinberg, who flew to Annapolis to watch the group perform and later began working with them. Around the same time, WHFS also began playing the demo. As the track became a hit in the area, record labels began showing interest in Good Charlotte. By the end of 1999, the band went on an east-coast tour with Lit. Representatives from several major labels attended the New York City show of the tour. Starting in 2000, the band became a full-time touring act, performing support slots for Lit, Goldfinger, Sum 41 and Mest. Following a showcase in New York City, the band met with people in the music industry. Within a week, everyone that saw the performance wanted to sign them. David Massey, executive vice president of A&R at Epic Records, signed the band to the label in May 2000.

== Recording and composition ==
Good Charlotte was recorded mainly at Encore Studios in Los Angeles, California, and was produced by Don Gilmore who also acted as engineer and was assisted by Mauricio Iragorri and engineer Bob Jackson. Additional engineering was done by John Ewing Jr. The band wanted to work with Gilmore as they liked his work on Eve 6's self-titled album (1998). Drums and bass were recorded at NRG Studios in Los Angeles with assistance from Matt Griffen in May 2000. Guitar and vocals were recorded in June with assistance from Paul Oliveira at Battery Studios in New York City. Martin, Thomas and Escolopio sang additional vocals on "Little Things" while HaHa contributed additional vocals on "The Motivation Proclamation". Vocals were recorded with assistance from Pete Novack at Larrabee West, Los Angeles. Gilmore mixed most of the songs except "Little Things", "Change" and "Seasons" at Encore Studios. He mixed "Little Things" at Battery Studios. "Change", "Seasons" and "Thank You Mom" were mixed by Tom Lord-Alge at South Beach Studios in Miami, Florida. Vlado Meller mastered all of the tracks except for "Little Things" at Sony Music Studios in New York City. "Little Things" was mastered by Ted Jensen at Sterling Sound in New York City.

Musically, the album has been described as pop-punk, drawing comparisons to Green Day, Smash Mouth, Eve 6 and Lit. All of the songs on Good Charlotte were written by the Madden brothers. Josh Ian wrote additional lyrics for "Seasons" and "Let Me Go". Throughout the release are references to religion and God, who the group go as far to give acknowledgement to in the album's booklet. "Little Things" makes reference to the Madden brothers' upbringing with their parents. One of the lines mentions their father abandoning them, which made Joel Madden uncomfortable. Benji Madden reasoned it worked within the context of the song. "Waldorfworldwide" is about the brothers' ambition and frustration; according to Joel Madden it was written when they had no money. According to Martin, "The Motivation Proclamation" talks about "breaking out of a cycle if you're depressed on something ... getting over it and going on". Joel Madden wrote "Festival Song", which is about attending HFStival, a festival he grew up with. The album's hidden track "Thank You Mom" is a tribute to the brothers' mother, who raised them after their father left, reminiscing on childhood memories.

== Release ==
"Little Things" was released to modern rock radio stations on July 24, 2000. Good Charlotte was released on September 26, 2000, through Epic and Daylight Records. The Japanese edition included "The Click", a cover of Orchestral Manoeuvres in the Dark's "If You Leave" and a live, acoustic version of "The Motivation Proclamation" as bonus tracks. Sales of the album did not meet the label's expectations and the group were nearly dropped from Epic. In October and November 2000, the group embarked on a US tour with Fenix TX, and another with MxPx that lasted until the end of the year. Also in November 2000, the music video for "Little Things" began receiving airplay on MTV. The video was filmed in Canada and was directed by Nigel Dick It depicts the band as troublemakers in high school; Joel Madden breaks into the principal's office and talks into a microphone addressing "Waldorf High School". The principal finds out and is angry with the band. He follows the microphone cable into the gym to find out who is causing trouble. The group are shown walking down a halfway and performing on a golf cart. Singer Mandy Moore, who appears as Madden's girlfriend in the video, is then seen. The clip ends with an impromptu concert in the gym.

In December 2000, Good Charlotte appeared at HFSmas, the winter edition of HFStival. "The Motivation Proclamation" was released to modern rock radio stations on January 29, 2001. On March 1, 2001, "Little Things" was released as a single in Australia. The CD version includes "The Click" and "Thank You Mom" as extra tracks. Despite the lack of success of "Little Things", Epic allowed the band to make a video for "The Motivation Proclamation". The video was directed by Marc Webb; it depicts the band members lying on the ground, waking up one-by-one and beginning to playing together. Scenes from Undergrads are shown being played on a television. Between March and May 2001, the group supported MxPx on their headlining US tour. In April, the video for "The Motivation Proclamation" received airplay on video outlets. While on the MxPx tour, Good Charlotte was consistently selling 3,000 copies per week. As a result, the group wanted to make a live music video. At the end of May, the group performed at HFStival. During their set, a music video for "Festival Song" was filmed; it was directed by Webb. The video is a mini-documentary about the day. Members of Mest, New Found Glory and Linkin Park appear in the video.

Sometime afterwards, Escolopio left the group to join his brother's band Wakefield. He was replaced by Nate Foutz of Vroom, who left the group after six weeks because Vroom signed a major label deal. Two days before the band went on tour, Dusty Bill was hired to play drums. The band gave him a copy of Good Charlotte and the following day, began practicing with him. "Festival Song" was released to modern rock radio stations on June 25, 2001. Between June and August 2001, Good Charlotte appeared on the Warped Tour. Between tour performances, the group performed at Y100 FEZtival.

On August 6, 2001, "The Motivation Proclamation" was released as a single in Australia. Following this, the band supported Blink-182 on their US tour before embarking on a tour of Australia in October. The group closed the year with a US headlining tour called the Uniting the States Tour, with support from Mest, the Movielife, and Midtown. In September 2004, the album was reissued as a two-CD package with The Young and the Hopeless (2002). It was reissued again in January 2010 in a box set alongside The Young and the Hopeless, The Chronicles of Life and Death (2004) and Good Morning Revival (2007).

== Reception ==
Professional ratings
Review scores
Source	Rating
AllMusic	3/5 stars
Entertainment Weekly	A−
Melodic	3.5/5 stars

=== Critical reception ===
AllMusic reviewer William Ruhlmann said, "The beats come fast and furious, the simple guitar chords noisily fill the middle range, and the vocals are sung with snotty belligerence". He also said the lyrics touch upon "standard-issue stuff" with the only oddity being "an occasionally expressed religious interest". Chart Attack wrote that the group sounds "so much like a cross between Eve 6 and Lit that it's frightening". The website said Good Charlotte is "energized with angsty teenage punk, and though the lyrics are cynical, the music is peppy and autobiographical". David Hiltbrand of Entertainment Weekly said "crosscurrents of anger and optimism" appear throughout the album, and that the band has an "astringent punk style" combined with "crafty pop underpinnings".

Melodic writer Johan Wippsson praised Gilmore's "very nice" production and called the record a "very nice punk-pop album with no really bad song". His only complaint was the lyrics, which he found to be a "little bit to [sic] teenaged" at times. Steve Schwadron of Ink 19 wrote that the lyrics seemed "very simplistic, and the music isn’t much more complicated", and apart from being "good party music", he does not "get much out of Good Charlotte". The Morning Call reviewer Joe Warminsky said the group "spares nothing in its effort" to join its contemporaries "of lame pop-rock bands that populate non-hip-hop radio". He said the album "wears thin quickly" and that most of the songs are "just plain shameless".

=== Commercial performance and legacy ===
Good Charlotte charted at number one on the Catalog Albums chart, number 13 on the Heatseekers Albums chart and number 185 on the Billboard 200. It also reached number 12 in New Zealand and number 194 in the UK. It was later certified silver in the UK and gold in the US. "Little Things" charted in the US at number 23 on both the Mainstream Top 40 and Alternative Songs charts. The album charted in Australia at number 61. "The Motivation Proclamation" charted in Australia at number 67.

Two tracks were remixed for inclusion on the band's Greatest Remixes (2008) compilation: "Waldorfworldwide" (retitled "Los Angeles World Wide"; by JNR SNCHZ) and "Little Things" (by Patrick Stump of Fall Out Boy). "Little Things", "The Motivation Proclamation" and "Festival Song" were included on the band's Greatest Hits (2010) compilation. Rolling Stone ranked the album at number 46 on their list of the 50 Greatest Pop-Punk Albums. In 2016, Benji Madden said of the album; "We were young and excited kids who were full of dreams and still trying to figure out our musical identity". Later that year, Joel Madden said; "[W]e didn’t over-think the pre-chorus, we didn’t think how we could make the bridge bigger, we wrote the songs until they were done. It’s more raw; the hope, the vibe and the spirit of that hopefulness has returned to the music." Jenna McDougall of Tonight Alive has expressed admiration for the album.

== Track listing ==
All songs written by Benji and Joel Madden. Additional lyrics on "Let Me Go" and "Seasons" by Josh Ian.

No.	Title	Length
1.	"Little Things"	3:23
2.	"Waldorfworldwide"	3:21
3.	"The Motivation Proclamation"	3:36
4.	"East Coast Anthem"	2:27
5.	"Festival Song"	3:00
6.	"Complicated"	2:49
7.	"Seasons"	3:15
8.	"I Don't Wanna Stop"	2:41
9.	"I Heard You"	2:43
10.	"Walk By"	2:42
11.	"Let Me Go"	3:01
12.	"Screamer"	3:36
13.	"Change" (includes hidden track "Thank You Mom")	8:38
Total length:		45:12

Japanese bonus tracks
No.	Title	Length
14.	"The Click"	3:33
15.	"If You Leave" (Orchestral Manoeuvres in the Dark cover)	2:45
16.	"The Motivation Proclamation" (live acoustic version)	3:42
Total length:		51:39

== Personnel ==
Personnel per booklet.

Good Charlotte

- Joel Madden – lead vocals
- Benji Madden – guitars, backing vocals
- Billy Martin – guitars, additional vocals (track 1)
- Paul Thomas – bass guitar, additional vocals (track 1)
- Aaron Escolopio – drums, percussion, additional vocals (track 1)

Additional musicians

- Jimi HaHa – additional vocals (track 3)

Production

- Don Gilmore – producer, recording, engineer, mixing (except tracks 7 and 13)
- Tom Lord-Alge – mixing (tracks 7 and 13)
- Bob Jackson – assistant engineer
- John Ewing Jr. – additional engineer, Pro Tools
- Matt Griffen – assistant
- Paul Oliveira – assistant
- Pete Novack – assistant
- Mauricio Iragorri – assistant
- Vlado Meller – mastering (except track 1)
- Ted Jensen – mastering (track 1)
- Kid Vicious – art concept
- Frank Harkins – art direction
- Julian Peploe – art direction
- Maja Blazejewska – design
- Topper – cover tattoo
- Rafael Fuchs – photography

== Charts and certifications ==
=== Weekly charts ===
Chart (2000–2004)	Peak position
Australian Albums (ARIA)	85
New Zealand Albums (RMNZ)	12
UK Albums (OCC)	194
US Billboard 200	185
US Top Catalog Albums (Billboard)	1
US Heatseekers Albums (Billboard)	13

=== Year-end charts ===
Chart (2002)	Position
Canadian Alternative Albums (Nielsen SoundScan)	185

=== Certifications ===
Region	Certification	Certified units/sales
United Kingdom (BPI)	Silver	60,000^{*}
United States (RIAA)	Platinum	1,000,000^{‡}
^{*} Sales figures based on certification alone.^{‡} Sales+streaming figures based on certification alone.
