= NACS =

NACS may refer to:

== Technology ==
- North American Charging Standard (SAE J3400), an electric vehicle charging standard originally developed by Tesla, Inc.

== Groups, companies, organizations ==
- National Association of Cambodian Scouts
- National Association of Convenience Stores
- North-American Catalan Society
- Northwest Allen County Schools
- Team Nacs, Japanese theatrical and music group

== Competitions, sports, games ==
- North American Challenge Skate
- North American League of Legends Challenger Series

== See also ==
- NAC (disambiguation)
