= Karl Silberbauer =

Nazi SS Officer who arrested the Anne Frank family (1911–1972)

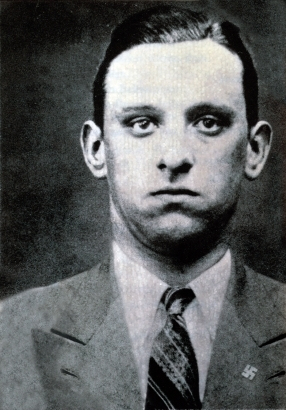
- Silberbauer c. 1939–1943
- Born: Karl Josef Silberbauer; 21 June 1911; Vienna, Austria-Hungary
- Died: 2 September 1972 (aged 61); Vienna, Austria
- Resting place: Mauer, Friedensstrasse; Vienna, Austria
- Occupations: SS-Hauptscharführer; Austrian Police Officer
- Known for: Apprehending and arresting Anne Frank while her family was in hiding
- Political party: Nazi Party

Karl Josef Silberbauer (21 June 1911 – 2 September 1972) was a Schutzstaffel (SS) member who led the 1944 Gestapo raid on the Anne Frank House and the arrests of Anne Frank, her fellow fugitives, and two of their protectors. He was stationed in Nazi-occupied Amsterdam during World War II, where he was promoted to the rank of Hauptscharführer (master sergeant) and after the war served 14 months in prison for using excessive force against members of the Communist Party of Austria. He was later an undercover investigator for the West German Bundesnachrichtendienst (federal intelligence service). In 1963, Silberbauer, by then an inspector in the Vienna police, was exposed as the commander of the 1944 Gestapo raid and arrests. He was not prosecuted for his participation in the arrests.

== Early life ==
Born in Vienna, Silberbauer served in the Austrian military before following his father into the police force in 1935. Four years later, he joined the Gestapo, moved to the Netherlands, and in 1943 transferred to the Sicherheitsdienst (SD) in The Hague. He was then assigned to Amsterdam and attached to "Sektion IV B4", a unit recruited from Austrian and German police departments and which handled arrests of hidden Jews throughout the occupied Netherlands. He was promoted to the rank of Hauptscharführer (master sergeant).

== The raid on the Frank Secret Annex ==
On 4 August 1944, Silberbauer was ordered by his superior, SS-Obersturmführer (Lieutenant) Julius Dettmann, to investigate a tip-off that Jews were being hidden in the upstairs rooms at 263 Prinsengracht. He took a few Dutch policemen with him and interrogated Victor Kugler about the entrance to the hiding place. Miep Gies and Johannes Kleiman were also questioned, and while Kugler and Kleiman were arrested and the young secretary Bep Voskuijl managed to escape with documents that would have incriminated the black market dealings of the Secret Annex protectors, Gies was allowed to stay on the premises. She later surmised this was because she recognized and connected with Silberbauer's Viennese accent. Both Otto Frank and Karl Silberbauer were interviewed after the war about the circumstances of the raid, with both describing Silberbauer's surprise that those in hiding had been there for more than two years. Frank recalled Silberbauer confiscating their valuables and money, taking these spoils away in Otto Frank's briefcase, which he had emptied onto the floor, scattering out the papers and notebooks which made up the diary of Anne Frank.

Soon after, Kugler and Johannes Kleiman, together with Otto Frank, Edith Frank-Holländer, Margot Frank, Anne Frank, Hermann van Pels, Auguste van Pels, Peter van Pels, and Fritz Pfeffer, were arrested and taken to Gestapo headquarters in Amsterdam. From there, the eight who had been in hiding were sent to the Westerbork transit camp and then to the Auschwitz concentration camp. Soon after, Margot and Anne Frank were sent to the Bergen-Belsen concentration camp, where they died from typhus. Victor Kugler and Jo Kleiman were sent to work camps. Of the ten, only Otto Frank, Kugler, and Kleiman survived.

== Undercover operations ==
Silberbauer returned to Vienna in April 1945. He served 14 months in prison for using excessive force against members of the Communist Party of Austria. After his release, Silberbauer was recruited by the West German Gehlen Organization, and spent ten years as a mole, or undercover operative for Gehlen and its successor the Federal Intelligence Service (BND). According to Der Spiegel reporter Peter-Ferdinand Koch, who learned of his postwar activities while researching BND employment of former Nazis, Silberbauer infiltrated neo-Nazi and pro-Soviet organizations in West Germany and Austria. His BND handlers believed, correctly, that Silberbauer's past membership in the SS would blind neo-Nazis to his true loyalties.

Possibly due to Gehlen Organization pressure, Silberbauer was reinstated by the Viennese Kriminalpolizei (Kripo) in 1954, four years after the German publication of Anne Frank's diary, and promoted to the rank of Inspektor.

== Identification ==
Holocaust survivor and Nazi hunter Simon Wiesenthal began searching for Silberbauer in 1958, upon being challenged by Austrian Holocaust deniers to prove that Anne Frank existed. One teenaged Holocaust denier stated that, if Anne Frank's arresting officer were found and admitted to it, he would change his mind.

During the 1948 Dutch police investigation into the raid on the Secret Annex, Silberbauer's name had been disclosed as "Silvernagel". The Dutch police detectives who had assisted with the raid were identified by Miep Gies, who recalled their commander as having a working-class Vienna accent. The Dutch policemen claimed to remember nothing except an erroneous form of their superior's surname.

Wiesenthal considered contacting Anne's father, Otto Frank, but learned that he was speaking out in favor of forgiveness and reconciliation. Otto also believed that the person responsible for the denunciation to the Gestapo, not the arresting officers, bore the greatest responsibility. Wiesenthal, however, was determined to discredit the growing Holocaust denial movement and continued his search for "Silvernagel". In late spring 1963, after ruling out numerous Austrians with similar names, Wiesenthal found a man named name Silberbauer, attached to "Sektion IV B 4", in a wartime Gestapo telephone book.

Wiesenthal contacted Josef Wiesinger, who investigated Nazi crimes for the Austrian Ministry of the Interior. Upon being told that Silberbauer might still be a policeman, Wiesinger insisted that there were "at least six men on the Vienna police force" with the same surname and insisted on a written request. On 2 June 1963, Wiesenthal submitted a detailed request but was told for months that the Vienna police were not yet ready to release their findings.

In reality, the Vienna police identified Inspektor Silberbauer almost immediately. When he had admitted his role in arresting Anne Frank, the department had been terrified of the bad press that would result from disclosing his past. Therefore, the Vienna police suspended Silberbauer from the Kripo without pay, ordering him to "keep his mouth shut" about the reasons for his suspension. Instead, Silberbauer lamented his suspension and disclosed the reasons for it to a colleague. His fellow officer, a member of the Communist Party of Austria, immediately leaked the story to the party's official newspaper, who published it on 11 November 1963. After Izvestia praised "the detective work of the Austrian comrades", an infuriated Wiesenthal leaked Silberbauer's address to the Dutch media. When reporters descended upon Silberbauer's Vienna home, the policeman freely admitted that he had arrested Anne Frank.

Upon being asked about Anne Frank's diary, Silberbauer stated: "I bought the little book last week to see if I am in it. But I am not." Upon being told by a reporter that he "could have been the first to read it", Silberbauer chuckled and said, "Maybe I should have picked it up off the floor."

== Silberbauer's recollections of the arrest ==
Silberbauer's memories of the arrest were notably vivid – he in particular recalled Otto and Anne Frank. When he asked Otto how long they had been in hiding, Otto replied, "Two years and one month." Silberbauer was understandably incredulous, until Otto stood Anne against the marks made on the wall to measure her height since they had arrived in the Annex, showing that she had grown even since the last mark had been made. Silberbauer said that Anne "looked like the pictures in the books, but a little older, and prettier. 'You have a lovely daughter', I said to Mr. Frank".

Although he disclosed what he knew, Silberbauer was unable to provide any information that could help further the Dutch police's investigation into the Dutch collaborator who provided the tip. He explained that the call was taken by his commanding officer, SS Lieutenant Julius Dettmann, who said only that the information came from "a reliable source". As Dettmann had committed suicide in prison (Huis van Bewaring, Havenstraat 6, Amsterdam, the Netherlands) on 25 July 1945, the second investigation also hit a dead end.

== Hearing and death ==
Although the Austrian government stated that the arrest of Anne Frank "did not warrant Silberbauer's arrest or prosecution as a war criminal", the Vienna Police convened a disciplinary hearing. Among the witnesses was Otto Frank, who testified that Silberbauer had "only done his duty and behaved correctly" during the arrest; however, Otto added: "The only thing I ask is not to have to see the man again."

As a result, the police review board exonerated Silberbauer of any official guilt. His unpaid suspension was lifted and the Vienna police assigned him to a desk job in the "Identification Office" (Erkennungsamt).

Silberbauer died in 1972.

== Sources ==
- David Barnouw; Gerrold van der Stroom (eds.). The Diary of Anne Frank: The Revised Critical Edition. Translated by Arnold J. Pomerans. Compiled by H. J. J. Hardy. (second ed.). Doubleday.
- Miep Gies; Alison Leslie Gold (1988). Anne Frank Remembered. Simon and Schuster. ISBN 9780671547714.
- Lee, Carol Ann (1999). Roses from the Earth: the Biography of Anne Frank. Penguin.
- Lee, Carol Ann (2002). The Hidden Life of Otto Frank. Penguin.
- Melissa Muller (1999). Anne Frank: the Biography. Foreword by Miep Gies. Bloomsbury.
- Francine Prose (2009). Anne Frank: The Book, the Life, the Afterlife. HarperCollins. ISBN 978-0061430794.
- Wechsberg, Joseph (1967). The Murderers Among Us: The Wiesenthal Memoirs. New York, McGraw-Hill.
- van Wijk-Voskuijl, Joop; De Bruyn, Jeroen (2023). The Last Secret of the Secret Annex: The Untold Story of Anne Frank, Her Silent Protector, and a Family Betrayal. Simon & Schuster. ISBN 9781982198213.
