= Treptow-Köpenick 4 =

State electoral district of Germany

- Electoral district for the Berlin House of Representatives
- Treptow-Köpenick 4 in 2023
- District: Treptow-Köpenick
- Electorate: 32,726 (2026)

Current electoral district
- Party: AfD
- Member: Alexander Bertram

Treptow-Köpenick 4 is an electoral constituency (German: Wahlkreis) represented in the House of Representatives of Berlin. It elects one member via first-past-the-post voting.

== Geography ==
In 2023, the constituency comprised the districts of Dammvorstadt, Kollnische Vorstadt/Spindlersfeld, Bohnsdorf, Grünau, and Schmöckwitz. It is entirely within the borough of Treptow-Köpenick.

There were 32,726eligible voters in 2026.

== Members ==
| Election | Member | Party | % |
|---|---|---|---|
| 1995 | Minka Dott | PDS | 31.9 |
| 1999 | Minka Dott | PDS | 38.0 |
| 2001 | Minka Dott | PDS | 39.9 |
| 2006 | Robert Schaddach | SPD | 32.8 |
| 2011 | Robert Schaddach | SPD | 33.0 |
| 2016 | Robert Schaddach | SPD | 27.0 |
| 2021 | Robert Schaddach | SPD | 26.6 |
| 2023 | Lisa Knack | CDU | 27.2 |
| 2026 | Alexander Bertram | AfD | 31.5 |

== Election results ==
=== 2026 election ===
State election (2026): Treptow-Köpenick 4
| Notes: | Blue background denotes the winner of the electorate vote. Pink background denotes a candidate elected from their party list. Yellow background denotes an electorate win by a list member, or other incumbent. A ✓ or ✗ denotes status of any incumbent, win or lose respectively. | | | | | | |
| Party | Candidate | Votes | % | ±% | Party votes | % | ±% |
|---|---|---|---|---|---|---|---|
| AfD | Alexander Bertram | 7,570 | 31.5 | ▲13.5 | 7,693 | 31.8 | ▲13.8 |
| CDU | Stefan Evers | 5,889 | 24.5 | ▼11.7 | 4,856 | 20.1 | ▼14.7 |
| Left | Lena Fries | 4,662 | 19.4 | ▲8.5 | 4,375 | 18.1 | ▲6.7 |
| SPD | Ellen Haußdörfer | 2,133 | 8.9 | ▼10.5 | 2,173 | 9.0 | ▼7.7 |
| BSW | Sven Pritsch | 1,534 | 6.4 | | 1,654 | 6.8 | |
| Greens | Willi Junga | 1,246 | 5.2 | ▼0.3 | 1,461 | 6.0 | ▲0.1 |
| Tierschutzpartei | | | | | 667 | 2.8 | Steady |
| FDP | Joachim Schmidt | 552 | 2.3 | ▼1.0 | 560 | 2.3 | ▼1.3 |
| Volt | Erik Dürrschmidt | 379 | 1.6 | | 290 | 1.2 | ▲0.8 |
| PARTEI | | | | | 192 | 0.8 | ▼0.3 |
| PdF | | | | | 140 | 0.6 | |
| HEIMAT | | | | | 42 | 0.2 | ▼0.1 |
| ÖDP | | | | | 39 | 0.1 | ▲0.1 |
| DKP | Axel Seelig | 71 | 0.3 | | 30 | 0.1 | ▼0.2 |
| du. | | | | | 18 | 0.1 | Steady |
| SGP | | | | | 13 | 0.1 | Steady |
| Informal votes | | 524 | | | 357 | | |
| Total valid votes | | 24,036 | | | 24,203 | | |
| Turnout | | 24,560 | 75.0 | ▲11.5 | | | |
| AfD gain from CDU | Majority | 1,681 | 7.0 | | | | |

=== 2023 repeat election ===
Changes denoted below for the 2023 election are compared to the 2016 election, as the 2021 election was declared invalid.

State election (2023): Treptow-Köpenick 4
| Notes: | Blue background denotes the winner of the electorate vote. Pink background denotes a candidate elected from their party list. Yellow background denotes an electorate win by a list member, or other incumbent. A ✓ or ✗ denotes status of any incumbent, win or lose respectively. | | | | | | |
| Party | Candidate | Votes | % | ±% | Party votes | % | ±% |
|---|---|---|---|---|---|---|---|
| CDU | Lisa Knack | 6,386 | 27.2 | ▲11.7 | 6,656 | 28.4 | ▲14.2 |
| SPD | Robert Schaddach | 5,538 | 23.6 | ▼3.4 | 4,212 | 17.9 | ▼2.2 |
| Left | André Schubert | 3,275 | 14.0 | ▼8.9 | 3,401 | 14.5 | ▼7.2 |
| AfD | Andreas Max Klupsch | 3,232 | 13.8 | ▼7.8 | 3,261 | 13.9 | ▼7.3 |
| Greens | Willi Junga | 2,359 | 10.1 | ▲1.8 | 2,600 | 11.1 | ▲3.3 |
| FDP | Jeanot Franke | 854 | 3.6 | | 1,011 | 4.3 | ▼0.6 |
| Tierschutzpartei | Stefan Moritz | 798 | 3.4 | | 630 | 2.7 | ▲0.7 |
| PARTEI | Marek Bauer | 507 | 2.2 | | 361 | 1.5 | ▼0.4 |
| The Grays | | | | | 169 | 0.7 | |
| Volt | | | | | 164 | 0.7 | |
| Gray Panthers | | | | | 130 | 0.6 | ▼0.7 |
| FW | Cornelia Flader | 282 | 1.2 | | 118 | 0.5 | |
| dieBasis | Andreas Ballenthin | 146 | 0.6 | | 109 | 0.5 | |
| Verjüngungsforschung | | | | | 74 | 0.3 | ▼0.4 |
| Pirates | | | | | 70 | 0.3 | ▼1.0 |
| NPD | Fritz Liebenow | 60 | 0.3 | ▼1.0 | 69 | 0.3 | ▼0.9 |
| Bildet Berlin! | | | | | 57 | 0.2 | |
| DKP | | | | | 57 | 0.2 | Steady |
| Humanists | | | | | 50 | 0.2 | |
| Mieterpartei | | | | | 49 | 0.2 | |
| Klimaliste | | | | | 44 | 0.2 | |
| Team Todenhöfer | | | | | 43 | 0.2 | |
| ÖDP | | | | | 37 | 0.2 | |
| du. | | | | | 26 | 0.1 | |
| The Pinks/Alliance 21 | | | | | 24 | 0.1 | |
| SGP | | | | | 14 | 0.1 | ▼0.1 |
| Bergpartei, die ÜberPartei | | | | | 12 | 0.1 | |
| LKR | Michael Meide | 27 | 0.1 | | 10 | 0.0 | ▼0.3 |
| BüSo | | | | | 10 | 0.0 | ▼0.1 |
| Informal votes | | 211 | | | 195 | | |
| Total valid votes | | 23,464 | | | 23,468 | | |
| Turnout | | 23,692 | 65.3 | ▼4.2 | | | |
| CDU gain from SPD | Majority | 848 | 3.6 | | | | |

=== 2021 election (annulled) ===
The election in 2021 was annulled and rerun in 2023.

State election (2021): Treptow-Köpenick 4
| Notes: | Blue background denotes the winner of the electorate vote. Pink background denotes a candidate elected from their party list. Yellow background denotes an electorate win by a list member, or other incumbent. A ✓ or ✗ denotes status of any incumbent, win or lose respectively. | | | | | | |
| Party | Candidate | Votes | % | ±% | Party votes | % | ±% |
|---|---|---|---|---|---|---|---|
| SPD | Robert Schaddach | 7,292 | 26.6 | ▼0.4 | 5,896 | 21.4 | ▲1.2 |
| Left | André Schubert | 4,564 | 16.7 | ▼6.2 | 4,774 | 17.3 | ▼4.4 |
| CDU | Lisa Knack | 4,218 | 15.4 | ▼0.1 | 4,348 | 15.8 | ▲1.6 |
| AfD | Andreas Max Klupsch | 3,269 | 11.9 | ▼9.6 | 3,305 | 12.0 | ▼9.2 |
| Greens | Willi Junga | 3,136 | 11.5 | ▲3.2 | 3,344 | 12.1 | ▲4.3 |
| FDP | Jeanot Franke | 1,896 | 6.9 | | 2,186 | 7.9 | ▲3.0 |
| Tierschutzpartei | Stefan Moritz | 965 | 3.5 | | 686 | 2.5 | ▲0.5 |
| PARTEI | Marek Bauer | 745 | 2.7 | | 560 | 2.0 | Steady |
| FW | Cornelia Flader | 630 | 2.3 | | 397 | 1.4 | |
| dieBasis | Andreas Ballenthin | 484 | 1.8 | | 398 | 1.4 | |
| The Grays | | | | | 272 | 1.0 | |
| Volt | | | | | 190 | 0.7 | |
| Gray Panthers | | | | | 165 | 0.6 | ▼0.6 |
| Verjüngungsforschung | | | | | 131 | 0.5 | ▼0.2 |
| APT | | | | | 129 | 0.5 | |
| Pirates | | | | | 127 | 0.5 | ▼0.9 |
| Team Todenhöfer | | | | | 90 | 0.3 | |
| NPD | Fritz Liebenow | 95 | 0.3 | ▼0.9 | 85 | 0.3 | ▼0.9 |
| Humanists | | | | | 70 | 0.3 | |
| Klimaliste | | | | | 62 | 0.2 | |
| ÖDP | | | | | 57 | 0.2 | |
| Mieterpartei | | | | | 57 | 0.2 | |
| LKR | Michael Meide | 91 | 0.3 | | 49 | 0.2 | ▼0.2 |
| DKP | | | | | 49 | 0.2 | ▼0.1 |
| du. | | | | | 46 | 0.2 | |
| Bildet Berlin! | | | | | 44 | 0.2 | |
| The Pinks/Alliance 21 | | | | | 18 | 0.1 | |
| Bergpartei, die ÜberPartei | | | | | 15 | 0.1 | |
| BüSo | | | | | 14 | 0.1 | ▼0.1 |
| SGP | | | | | 5 | 0.0 | ▼0.1 |
| Informal votes | | 322 | | | 256 | | |
| Total valid votes | | 27,385 | | | 27,569 | | |
| Turnout | | 27,865 | 77.9 | ▲8.4 | | | |
| SPD hold | Majority | 2,728 | 9.9 | | | | |

== See also ==
- Politics of Berlin
- House of Representatives of Berlin
