= Julius Dettmann =

German SS officer

- Born: Julius Dettmann; January 23, 1894; Königsberg, Kingdom of Prussia, German Empire
- Died: July 25, 1945 (aged 51); Amsterdam, Netherlands
- Cause of death: Suicide by hanging
- Occupations: Schutzstaffel (SS), Sicherheitsdienst (SD);
- Known for: Arresting Anne Frank
- Political party: National Socialist German Workers Party (Nazi Party)

Julius Dettmann (January 23, 1894 – July 25, 1945) was a German Schutzstaffel (SS) officer in the Sicherheitsdienst (Security Service; SD), known as the officer who had Anne Frank and her relatives and friends arrested and deported while they were hiding in the secret annex.

Detmann served in the German Army during the First World War. He was a member of the Nazi Party (NSDAP) and his Party number was 722,240. Thereafter, he joined the Schutzstaffel (SS); his SS number was 414,783. He was attached to Section IVB4 or the Gestapo, after having served in Poland and Russia. He was stationed in Amsterdam during the German occupation of the Netherlands and was promoted to SS-Obersturmführer (lieutenant) on November 9, 1942.

On August 4, 1944, he received a phone call reporting that there were Jews hidden in the premises of 263 Prinsengracht in Amsterdam. The individuals in question were Anne Frank, her parents, sister, and four others. He immediately dispatched a squad led by SS-Oberscharführer (staff sergeant) Karl Silberbauer, telling Silberbauer that the call had come from "a reliable source". Silberbauer and his contingent of NSB plain-clothes officers raided the building and arrested the eight people in hiding who, after questioning at SD headquarters, were deported to the Westerbork transit camp and from there, to various labour and concentration camps.

Dettmann was also in charge of the execution of fifteen resistance fighters, among them Johannes Post, an idol of the Dutch Resistance. The execution took place July 16, 1944, near Overveen. After the war in Europe ended, Dettmann was arrested in the Netherlands and remained a prisoner of war. However, he hanged himself in Amsterdam at the Havenstraat prison on July 25, 1945, at 4am, before being taken to court.

He was buried July 31, 1945, at the Noorder Begraafplaats cemetery in Amsterdam, the Netherlands. On August 17, 1956, his remains were transferred to Ysselsteyn German war cemetery.
