= Nak (disambiguation) =

NAK is the negative-acknowledge character used in computers and telecommunications.

NAK or Nak may also refer to:

- Nak, Hungary
- NaK, an alloy of sodium and potassium metals
- Mae Nak Phra Khanong, a ghost of Thai folklore
  - Nak (film), a 2008 animated film based on the Thai ghost
- Ningalkkum Aakaam Kodeeshwaran, a quiz show in Malayalam based on Who Wants To Be A Millionaire?
- NAK, the IATA airport code for Nakhon Ratchasima Airport

== People ==
- Igor Nak (born 1963), Russian political figure
- Vladimir Nak (1935–2010), Russian transport engineer
- Nicolas Aubé-Kubel (born 1996), Canadian ice hockey player sometimes abbreviated as "NAK"

== Science ==
Sodium-potassium alloy,commonly abbreviated

== See also ==
- NakNak, collectable toy line by Hasbro
- Knack (disambiguation)
- KNAK (disambiguation), including callsign K-NAK
- Nack (disambiguation)
- NAC (disambiguation)
- NAKS (disambiguation)
- Naq (disambiguation)
- WNAK (disambiguation), including callsign W-NAK
