= Ysselsteyn German war cemetery =

Cemetery in Venray, Netherlands

Ysselsteyn war cemetery
- German War Graves Commission; Volksbund Deutsche Kriegsgräberfürsorge.
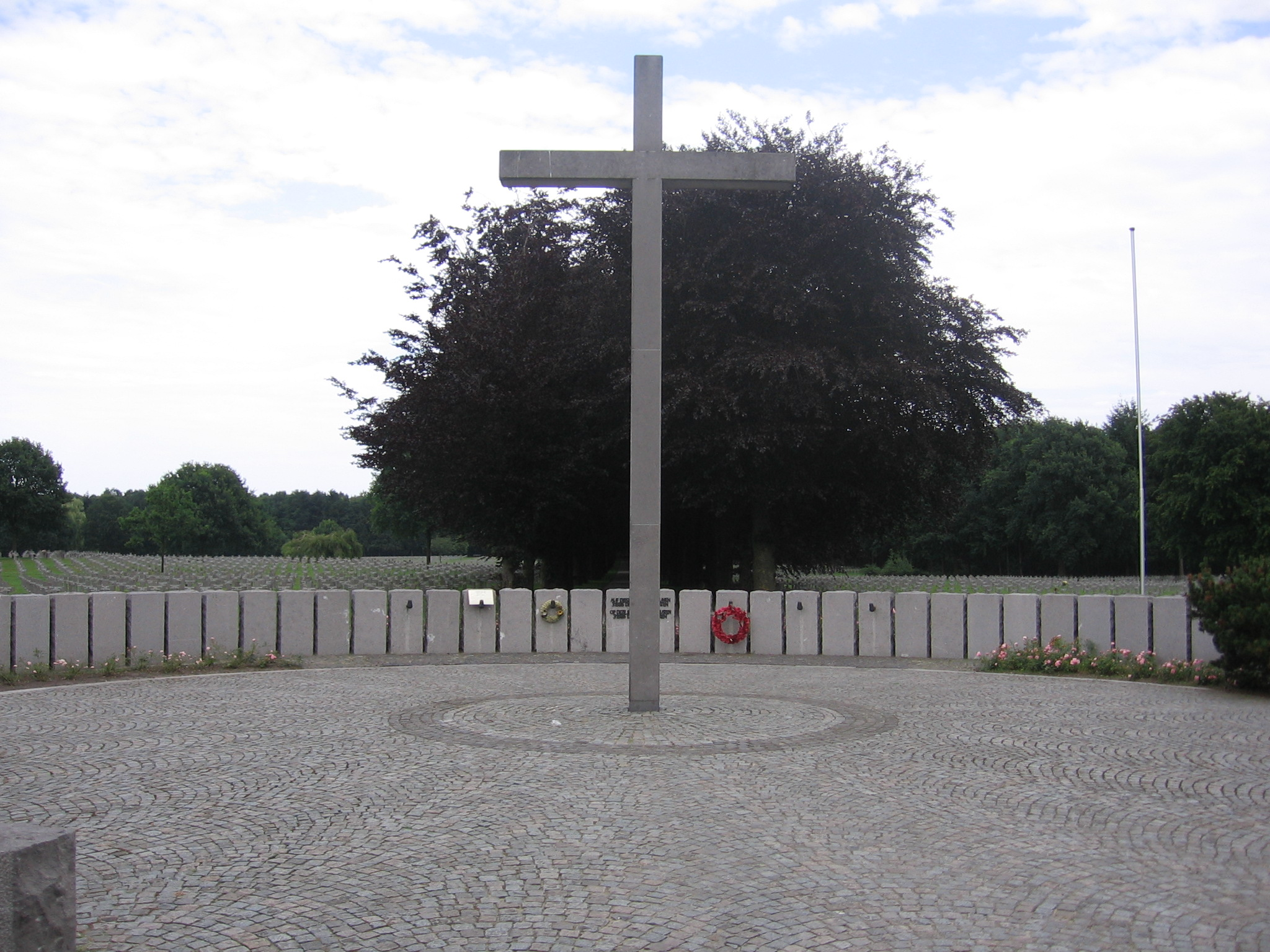
- Cemetery Ysselsteyn
- Used for those deceased 1939–1945
- Established: 1946
- Location: 51°28′08″N 5°53′27″E near Venray, Netherlands
- Total burials: 31,813
- Unknowns: appr. 4,000

Burials by nation
- Germany and Nazi Hiwis; Austria, Belarus, Belgium, Croatia, Czechoslovakia, Georgia, Hungary, the Netherlands, Poland, Romania,

Burials by war
- World War I (87); World War II (31,000); postwar appr. 500

Ysselsteyn German War Cemetery is a military cemetery interring casualties of the First and Second World Wars. It contains over 31,000 dead from around 25 countries, including Wehrmacht and SS-men and Dutch war criminals. This cemetery is located in the village of Ysselsteyn in the municipality of Venray in Limburg, Netherlands, and is 32 km (20 mi) east of Eindhoven. Ysselsteyn is the largest Second World War German cemetery and is the only Nazi-German cemetery in the Netherlands. Following the war, the Nazi soldiers were reburied in the cemetery. The deceased include Germans, Austrians, Dutch, Poles, Russians and many who fought on the side of Nazi Germany or supported them in non-military roles.

== World War I and II burials ==
Most burials are soldiers killed during the German occupation from May 1940 to May 1945 in the Netherlands. Around 250 of the dead (Nazi-German Wehrmacht and SS, as well as collaborating Dutch), were killed by the Dutch resistance. Around 3,000 of the burials were soldiers detailed to occupation duties, including razzias, deportations, illegal incarceration, Jew-hunting, and other war crimes. 250 more deaths (Wehrmacht) are from the Battle of the Bulge in the Ardennes and Hürtgenwald that were initially interred next to the Netherlands American Cemetery in Margraten.

In a circle near the entrance lie 87 German soldiers who died in World War I and whose bodies floated to the Netherlands down rivers, mainly the Meuse. The Netherlands remained neutral during the First World War.

Over 5,000 unknown burials are located in the cemetery and were marked incorrectly as "Ein Deutscher Soldat" (A German Soldier).

After World War II, all German fatalities were buried there. In 1976 administration was transferred to the German War Graves Commission (Volksbund Deutsche Kriegsgräberfürsorge). The designation as a German burial ground is disputed as many buried there were non-Germans serving in the German armed forces, comprising 25 nationalities. Dutch, Belgian, Russian, Czech, and many tens of so-called "Volksdeutsche" from Poland, the Danzig Free State, Luxemburg, Slovakia, and even Kazakhstan and Azerbaijan may also be buried there.

== Architecture ==
The cemetery covers approximately 28 ha (69 acres). Most burials are in individual graves marked by a grey concrete cross that includes (where known) the name, rank, and dates of birth and death. A tall cross stands in the central memorial plaza. Roads extending right and left from the plaza contain a carillon and common graves.

A memorial stone honors Captain Johan Lodewijk Timmermans, a Dutchman who served as manager of the cemetery from 1948 to 1976 on behalf of the Dutch government. Upon his death, his ashes were scattered at the cemetery per his request.

== Protests ==
From the 1960s, protests were lodged against the German dead and the cemetery. The protests were revived in 2013, when the Dutch Anti-Fascists' League AFVN discovered that since the year 2000, the German ambassador had been holding yearly commemorations there. In 2020, the AFVN started a petition against the visits of the ambassador with Dutch and German Jews joining the effort, along with Beate Klarsfeld and the management of the former Dachau concentration camp. A petition was launched to end the honouring and was subscribed by a.o. the board of the Dachau Museum and Concentration camp, leading Jewish figures such as the Dutch chief rabbi Binyomin Jacobs. The ambassador ended the practice.

In 2020, the American Ambassador to the Netherlands visited the cemetery and tweeted photos of the graves.

== Neo-Nazis ==
The cemetery gets irregular visits from Neo-Nazis. In November 2020, a Belgian woman placed flowers on the grave of the first Dutch SS-volunteer Willem Heubel.

== Notable dead ==
Among the most notable dead in the cemetery are:

- Julius Dettmann (23 January 1894 – 24 July 1945), a German SS-officer who had Anne Frank, her family and friends deported from their hiding place in Amsterdam

== Gallery ==
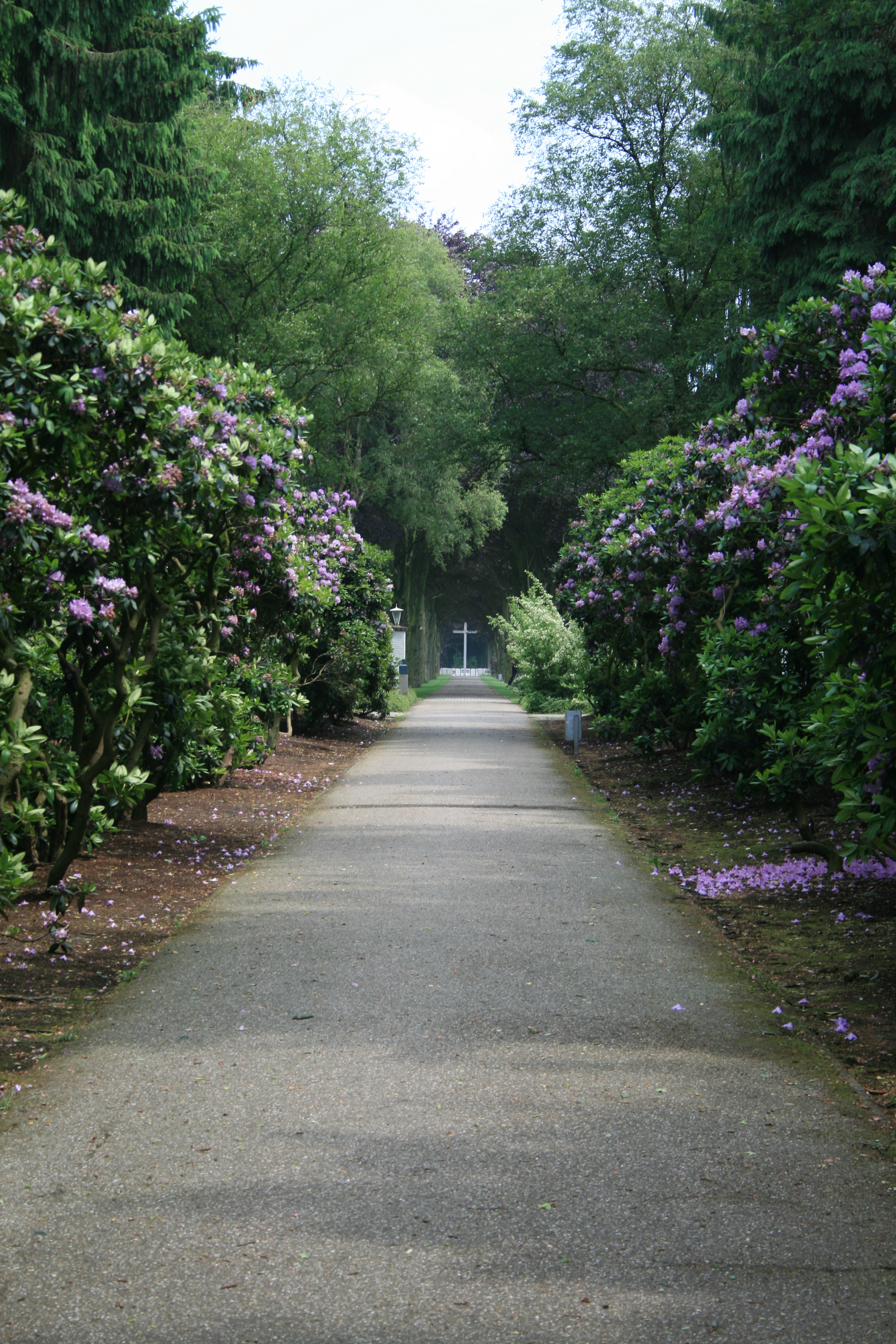

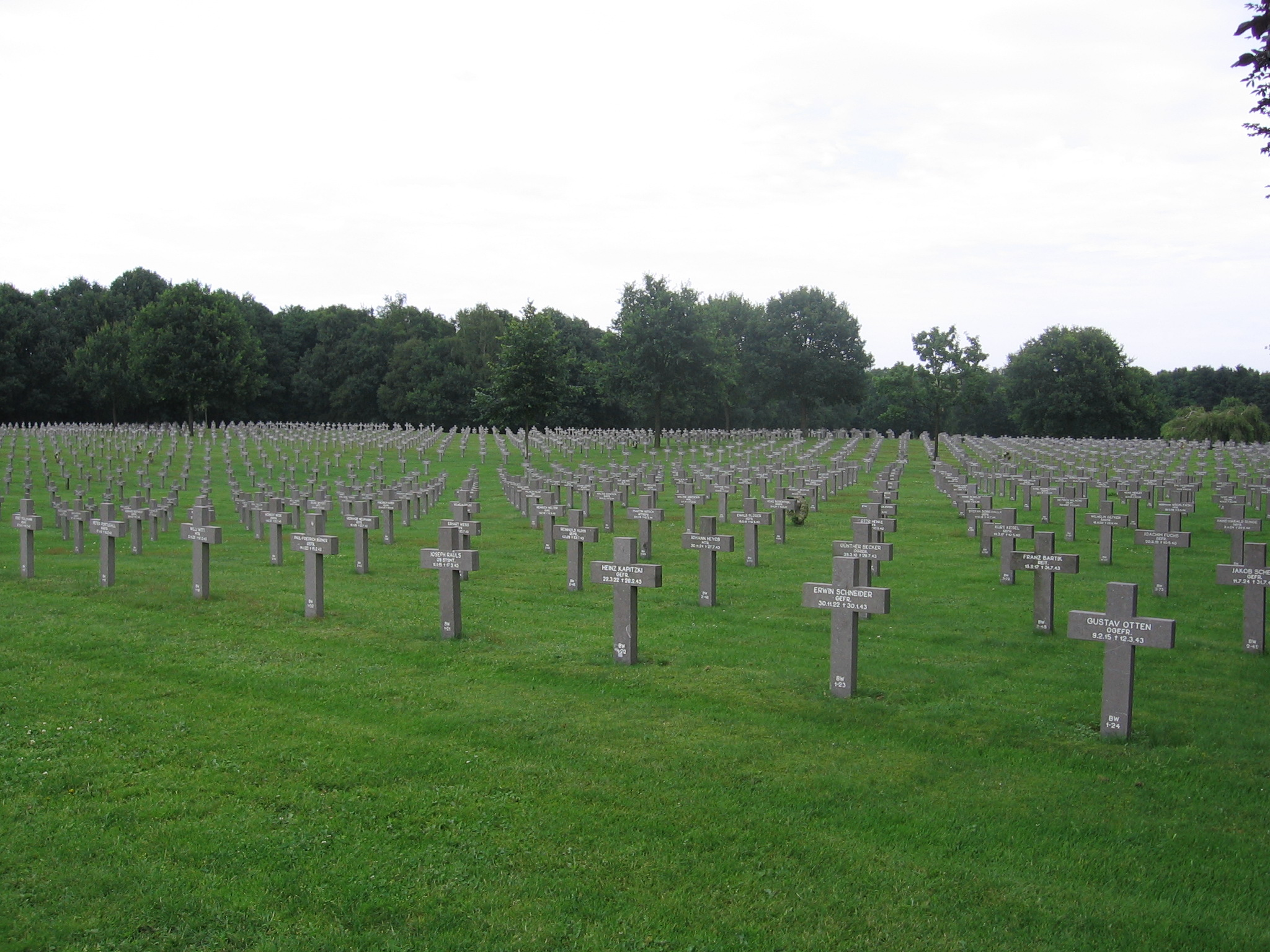

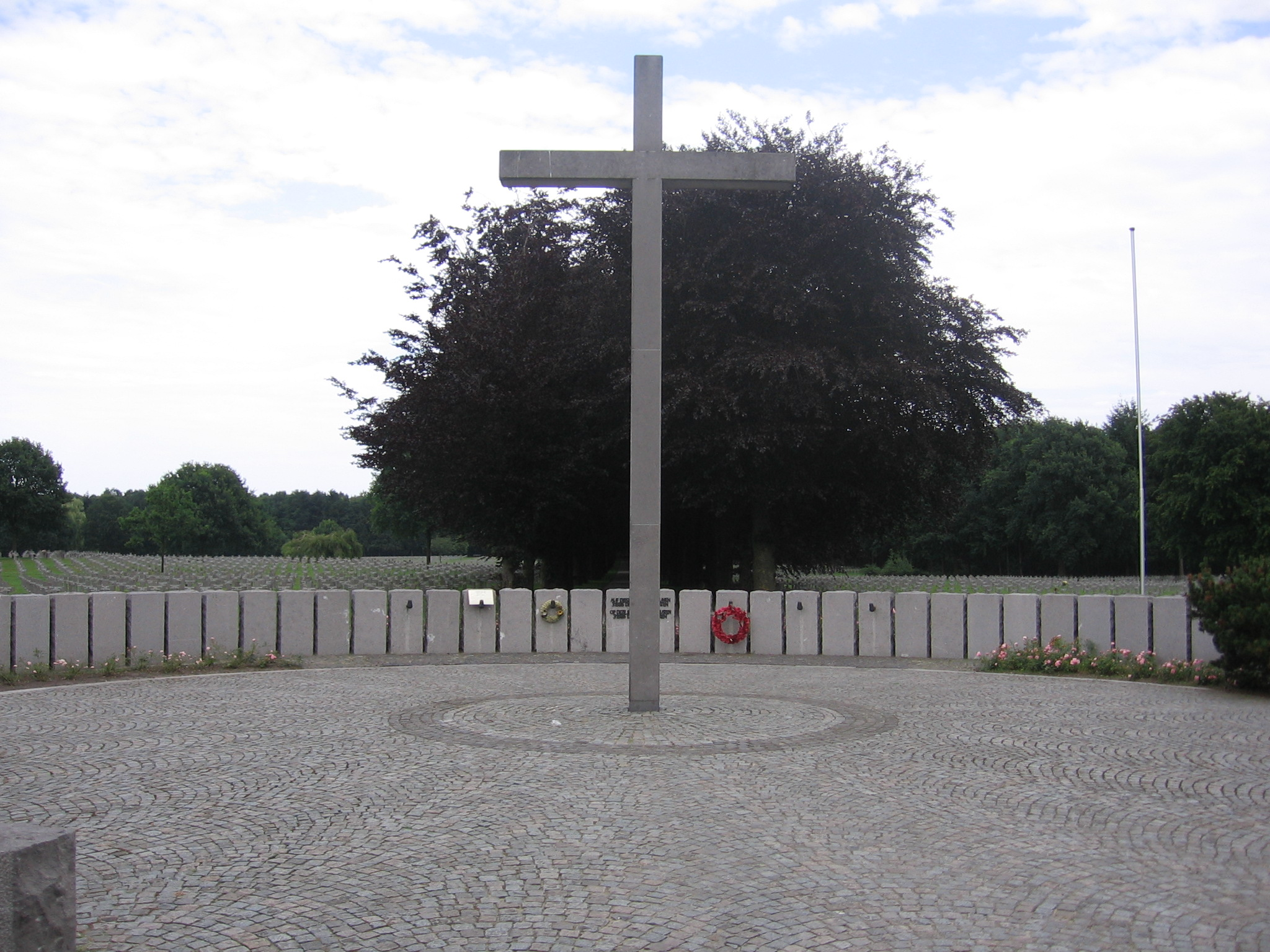

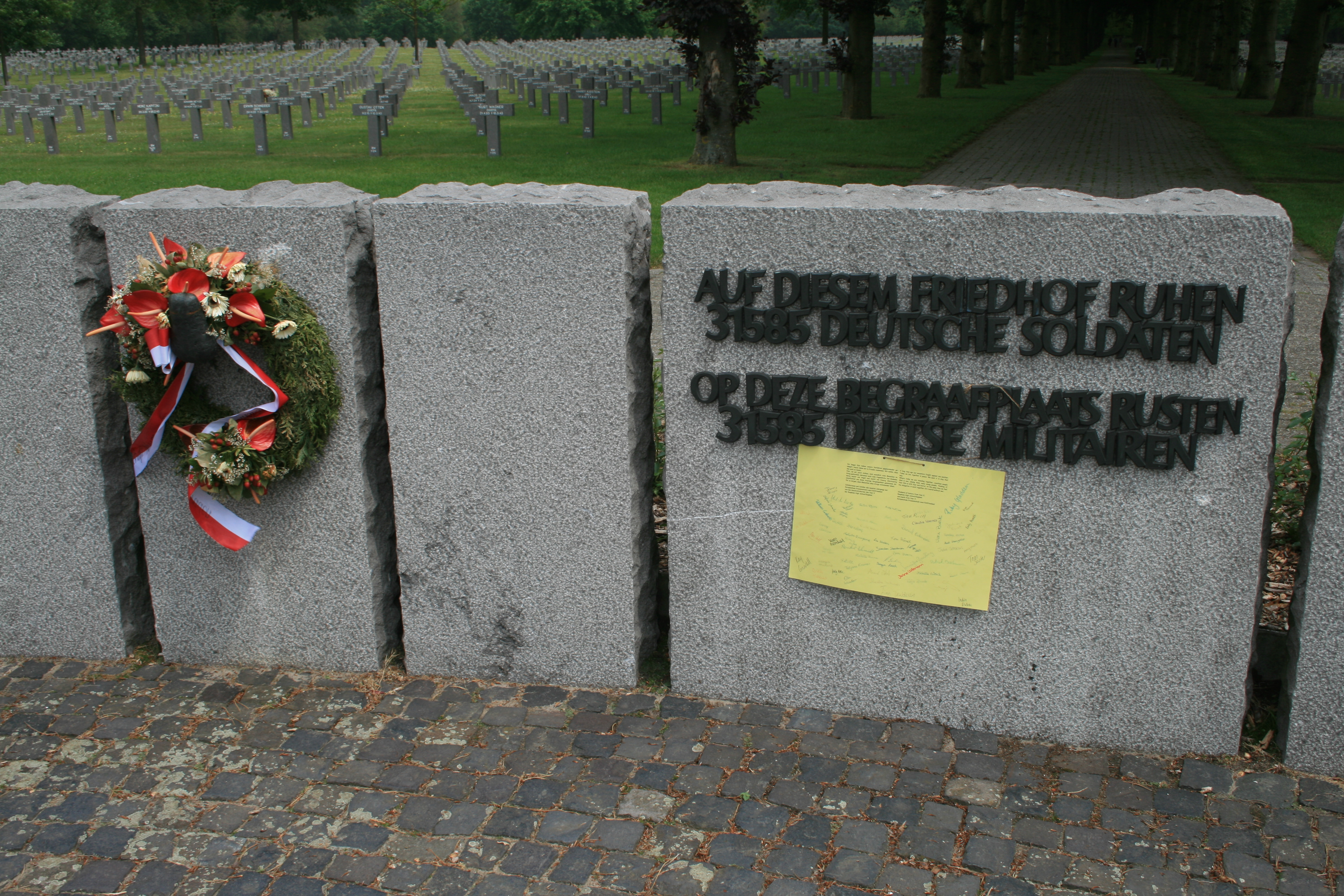

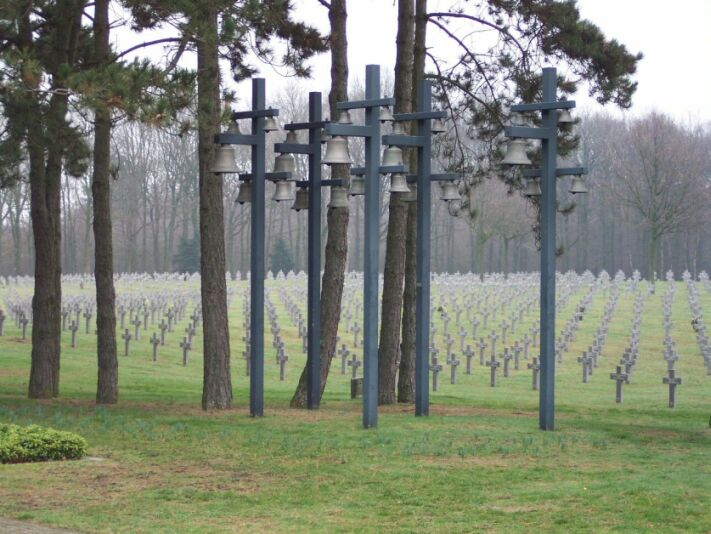

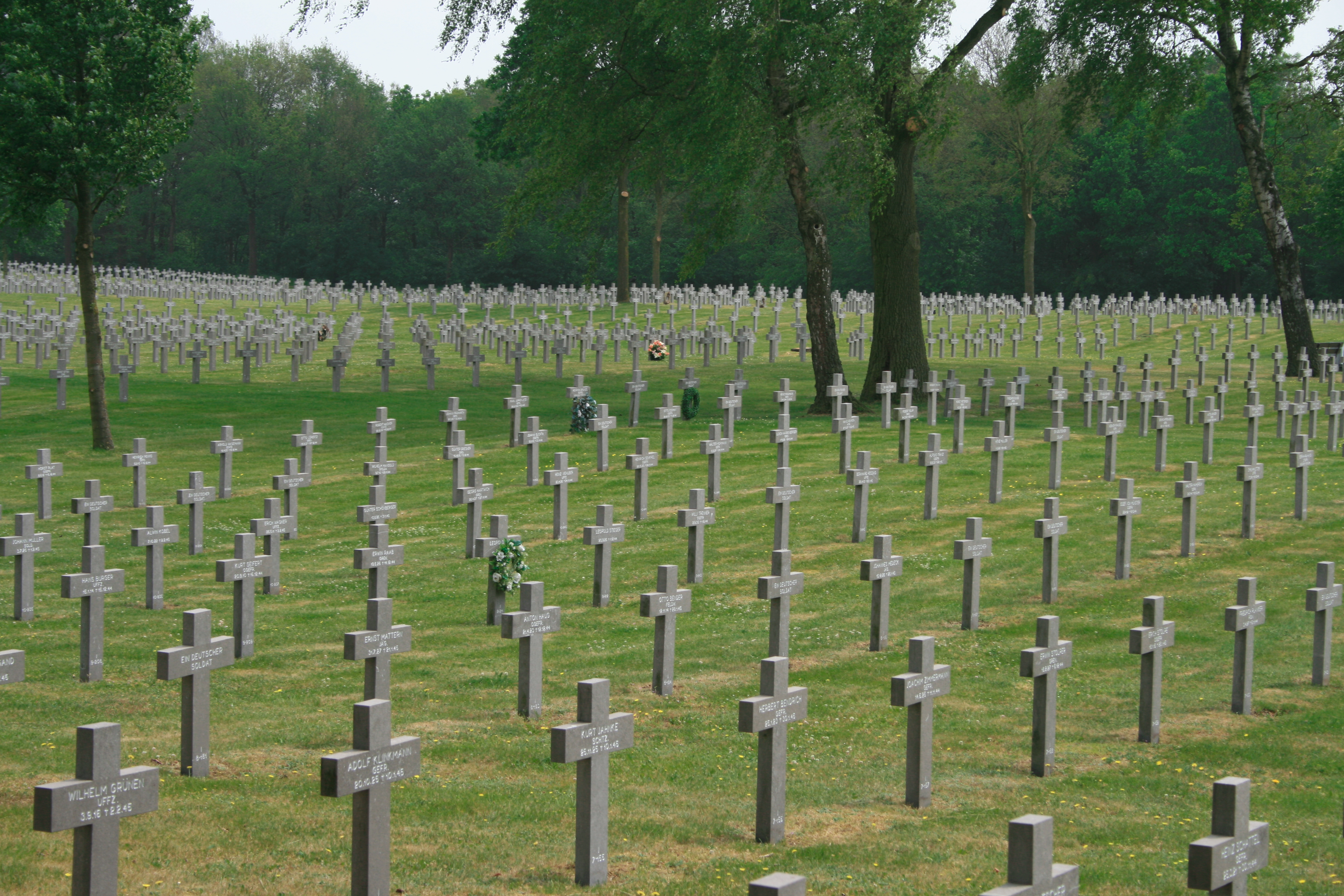

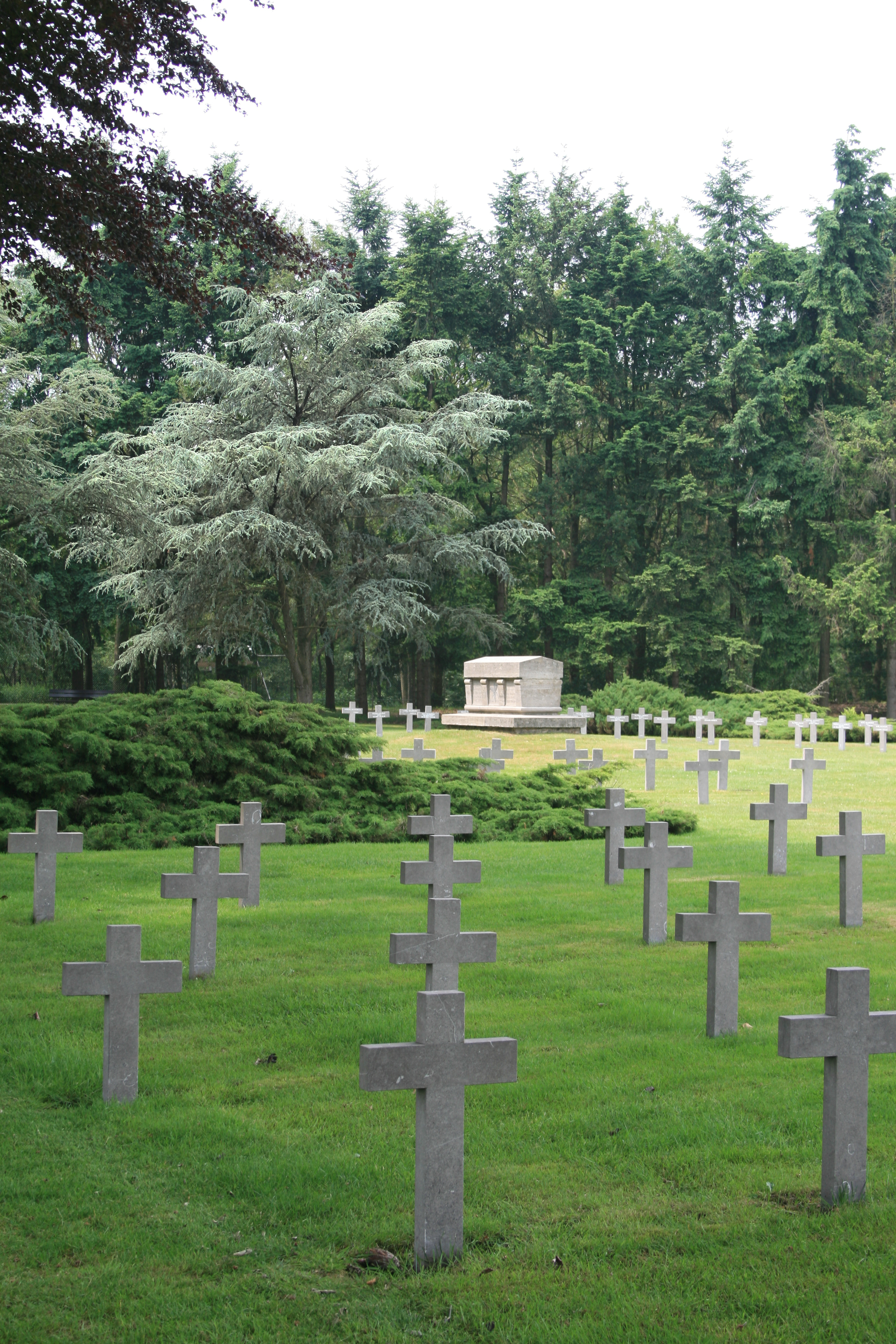

== See also ==
- World War II memorials and cemeteries in the Netherlands
- Arnhem Oosterbeek War Cemetery
