= Fritz Knaak =

American lawyer and politician

Frederic W. "Fritz" Knaak (born January 2, 1953) is an American lawyer and politician.

Knaak was born in Rochester, Minnesota. He lived in White Bear Lake, Minnesota, with his family and graduated from White Bear Lake High School in 1971. He graduated from Saint John's University in 1975 and from the University of Minnesota Law School in 1978. He practiced law in White Bear Lake. Knaak served in the Minnesota Senate from 1983 to 1992 as a Republican. His mother, Delores J. Knaak, also served in the Minnesota Legislature.
