= Ysselsteyn =

- Village
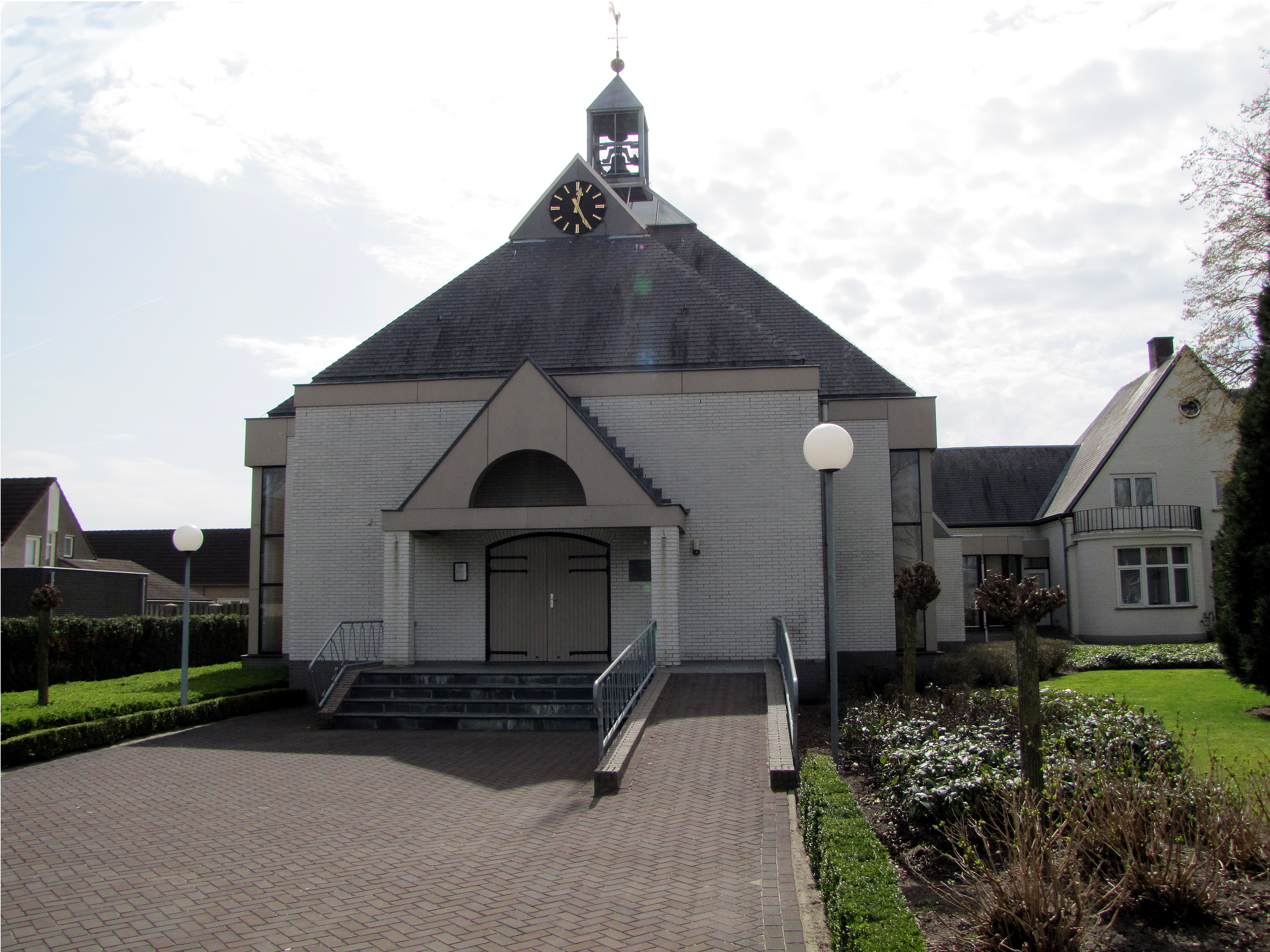
- St Oda Church

- Location in the Netherlands Location in the province of Limburg in the Netherlands
- Coordinates: 51°29′24″N 5°53′45″E
- Country: Netherlands
- Province: Limburg
- Municipality: Venray

Area
  - Total: 33.62 km^{2} (12.98 sq mi)
- Elevation: 31 m (102 ft)

Population (2021)
  - Total: 2,280
  - Density: 67.8/km^{2} (176/sq mi)
- Time zone: UTC+1 (CET)
  - Summer (DST): UTC+2 (CEST)
- Postal code: 5813
- Dialing code: 0478

Ysselsteyn is a village in the municipality of Venray in Limburg, Netherlands. It was established in 1921 and named after its designer, Hendrik Albert van IJsselsteyn, then Minister of Agriculture. Ysselsteyn has an extensive hog raising industry.

The Catholic St Oda Church is a square aisleless church with ridge turret. In 1944, it was damaged by war and rebuilt in 1947. In 1975, a carillon was built next to the church.

Ysselsteyn's main object of interest is the Ysselsteyn German war cemetery at Timmermansweg 73, which covers about 28 hectares (69 acres) and contains the graves of 31,598 German war dead, most of whom who died in the Netherlands during World War II.
