= Knick =

Knick may refer to:

- Knickerbocker Hospital, a.k.a. The Knick, a defunct hospital of New York City
- New York Knicks (NBA basketball team), a Knick is a player for the Knicks
- Westchester Knicks (G-League basketball team), a Knick is a player for the Knicks
- The Knick, American television medical drama
- Knick v. Township of Scott, Pennsylvania, 2019 U.S. Supreme Court decision on compensation for state/local taking of private property

== See also ==
- Knickerbocker (disambiguation)
- Knick Knack (disambiguation)
- Nick (disambiguation)
- NIC (disambiguation)
- Nik (disambiguation)
- 'Nique (disambiguation)
- Nix (disambiguation)
