= Delores J. Knaak =

American educator and politician (1929–2020)

Delores J. "Dee" Knaak (July 13, 1929 – February 9, 2020) was an American educator and politician.

Knaak was born Delores Jean McComber in Hibbing, Minnesota, and graduated from Hibbing High School and Hibbing Junior College. She went to St. Cloud State University. Knaak lived in White Bear Lake, Minnesota, and taught elementary school. She served on the Ramsey County Commission. Knaak served in the Minnesota Senate from 1977 to 1980 as a Republican. She then served on the Minnesota Public Utilities Commission from 1991 to 1996. Knaak died in Maplewood, Minnesota. Her son, Fritz Knaak, also served in the Minnesota Legislature.
