= Knacker (band) =

Rock band from Ontario, Canada

- Origin: Toronto, Ontario, Canada
- Genres: Indie rock
- Years active: 1998–2005
- Label: Axis Music Group
- Members: Dean Marino; Pete Marino; Jeff Nedza
- Past members: Gerard Ross; Chris Edleman
- Website: knacker.net

Knacker was a Canadian indie rock band from Toronto, Ontario, Canada.

== History ==
The band was formed in 1998 by brothers Dean Marino and Peter Marino with guitarist Jeff Nedza and drummer Gerard Ross.

The band made frequent live appearances, and opened for Sum41, Billy Talent, Limblifter, The Killjoys, Three Days Grace, and The Meligrove Band. Much of Knacker's music can be heard in the soundtracks of television shows, including MTV's Undergrads and The N's Radio Free Roscoe.

The band's first CD, The Self-Titled Blue EP, was released independently in 1998 and was played on Canadian campus radio. They followed this with Snapshot (2000), their most well-known work.

In 2002, Ross left the band and was replaced by drummer Chris Edelman. That year Snapshot was nominated for "Best Rock Record" at the 2nd Annual Canadian Independent Music Awards. The band continued to live in clubs and at festivals before releasing a CD, Picture Show in 2005. The band worked on recording another album, to be titled Houses Basements and Apartments, but this was never released.

The band became inactive in 2005. Dean Marino became the co-owner of Chemical Sound Studios and a record producer/engineer, records music under the moniker EX~PO, and plays guitar for the alternative country/indie rock band Tin Star Orphans. Pete Marino records under the moniker 'The Trampoline Delay' and released a full-length album titled In Your Head in 2022.

== Members ==
=== Former ===
- Chris Edelman - Drums (2002–2005)
- Dean Marino - Guitar/Vocals
- Peter Marino - Bass guitar/Vocals
- Jeff Nedza - Guitar
- Gerard Ross - Drums (1998–2002)

== Discography ==
=== EPs ===
- Self Titled Blue EP (Axis Music Group, 1998)

=== Albums ===
- Snapshot (Axis Music Group, 2000)
- Picture Show (Landed Music, 2004)

== See also ==
- Music of Canada
- Canadian rock
- List of Canadian musicians
- List of bands from Canada
- Category:Canadian musical groups
