= Undergrads =

Canadian-American adult animated sitcom (2001)

- The title card featuring the silhouettes of the four main characters (left to right: Rocko, Nitz, Gimpy and Cal)
- Created by: Pete Williams
- Developed by: Pete Williams; Josh A. Cagan
- Directed by: Jerry Popowich
- Voices of: Pete Williams; Richard Binsley; Alan Park; Susan Dalton; Jene Yeo; Yannick Bisson; Michael McMurty; Robert Tinkler; Edward Glenn
- Opening theme: "The Click" by Good Charlotte from their self titled album
- Composers: Jono Grant; Chris Ross
- Countries of origin: United States; Canada
- No. of seasons: 1
- No. of episodes: 13

Production
- Executive producers: Neil Court; Steven DeNure; Abby Terkuhle
- Producers: David McGrath; Beth Stevenson
- Editor: Martin Jefferson
- Running time: 22 minutes
- Production companies: MTV Animation; Decode Entertainment (Note: As Decode/Click Productions); Funbag Animation

Original release
- Network: MTV (US); The Detour on Teletoon (Canada)
- Release: April 22 – August 12, 2001

Undergrads (stylized as underGRADS) is an adult animated sitcom centered on the lives of four college undergraduate freshmen. The show was originally broadcast for 13 episodes on MTV from April 22 to August 12, 2001, and was also shown on The Detour on Teletoon in Canada, and Trouble in the United Kingdom.

== History ==
The show was created by Pete Williams, who dropped out of New York University at the age of 19 during his sophomore year to work on the show in 1997 after winning an MTV animation contest by creating an animated short called The Click. Williams performs most of the voices on the show. The series was produced by David McGrath and directed by Jerry Popowich.

=== Cancellation ===
The series was cancelled after just one season due to low ratings and according to Pete Williams the show left the prime time slot by the third episode and practically stopped airing on MTV by the sixth episode and ended without any warning. Unbeknownst to Williams his show had a much better following in Canada when it aired on Teletoon at Night. Williams only realized that his series was over after his MTV employee keycard suddenly stopped working forcing him to file for unemployment benefits and move back in with his parents. After his show was canceled, Pete Williams and his brother earned a living selling spec scripts for animated series’ to various networks that never got green-lit.

=== Unsuccessful revival and Undergrads: The Movie ===
After an unsuccessful revival attempt in 2004 by the Canadian based studio Decode Entertainment which was to air on Teletoon due to MTV still holding the rights to the show at the time sabotaging the attempt, Williams 14 years later in June 2018 after a long legal dispute announced that he had managed to secure the rights from MTV and formally announced a Kickstarter campaign for funding a feature-length series finale called Undergrads: The Movie. As of August 2023 after the film is currently in development by Brain Power Studio with a budget of $150,000 which was raised in February 2019 after the successful Kickstarter campaign, and was set for a 2023 release but it has since been delayed indefinitely due to personal issues with Pete Williams.

The film, Undergrads: The Movie, is in development from Brain Power Studio, with a budget of $150,000 (acquired following a successful Kickstarter campaign).

== Overview ==
Characters in the show represent a dramatic portrayal of stereotypical college types; including the stable, sarcastic everyman (Nitz); the boisterous, alcoholic "frat boy" (Rocko); the handsome dimwitted "ladies' man" (Cal); the reclusive nerd (Gimpy), the rebellious punk girl (Jessie); the "ditz" (Kimmy); the resident advisor (The Duggler). Typical realistic situations depicted in the show but in an overly dramatic and comedic manner include student loans, abysmal cafeteria food, questioning of identity, fraternity rivalries, odd traditions, unpleasant tyrannical RAs, money problems, peer pressure, and the "freshman 15". Despite the series taking place in college there are almost no episodes that depict the characters attending class; the one exception is Rocko's ROTC class in the episode, "Financial Aid".

The exact location of the series is never revealed to the audience and is up for interpretation. In the episode “Drunks” the protagonists use false New York drivers licenses to buy alcohol as creator Pete Williams briefly attended a university in New York before creating the show which could imply that the series takes place in Upstate New York as there are many college towns in that region. However in the beginning of the series one of the protagonists disguises his friend as a California Highway Patrol officer.

== Characters ==
=== Main ===
- Parker "Nitz" Walsh (voiced by Pete Williams) is the protagonist. He is shy and attends State U, a generic university. He often finds himself torn between hanging out with his old high school friends, the new friends he's made at college, and pining after his high school crush, Kimmy Burton. Nitz is based on series creator, Pete Williams.
- Rocko (voiced by Pete Williams) is a boorish, alcoholic, chain-smoking fratboy. He attends the local Central State Junior Community College and is a proud member of the Alpha Alpha fraternity, although he is not respected by his fellow frat brothers, who view him as an obnoxious nuisance. His only interests are alcohol and women, although most women do not reciprocate his clumsy advances and often rebuff him. He is bitterly jealous of his friend Cal's popularity with women and is often shown openly expressing his disdain for the latter whenever he interacts with him.
- Cal Evans (voiced by Pete Williams) is Nitz' roommate. Although dimwitted, his good looks make him very popular with women. He speaks in a high-pitched voice, frequently drools, and calls people "guy" or "lady".
- Justin "Gimpy" Taylor (voiced by Pete Williams) is a reclusive nerd who attends the tech institute Tekerson Tech. He almost never leaves his room, primarily communicating with his friends via video chat. Gimpy uses the screen name "G Prime" and commands a group of fellow geeks to act as his minions. He is a fiercely devoted Star Wars fan and has a vendetta against Star Trek.

=== Supporting ===
- Jessie (voiced by Jene Yeo) is a friend and neighbor of Nitz, also goes to State U. Jessie has a very laid back, punk-girl-type personality on campus. She often accompanies Nitz on his misadventures and often provides a level-headed and mature point of view. Although Nitz openly pines for Kimmy Burton throughout the show's run, Jessie develops a crush on Nitz to which he is oblivious. Jessie's frustration with Nitz eventually results in outright spite for Kimmy. The character is voiced by Jene Yeo, upon whom the character is based.
- Kimmy Burton (voiced by Susan Quinn) is a clueless redheaded girl Nitz has had a crush on since high school. Kimmy attends State U and tries to be involved with all of the on-campus activities. Spacey and self-centered, she is completely oblivious to Nitz's affections. Kimmy is romantically interested in Mark, another drama student at the college, but does not realize he is gay despite Mark making little to no effort to hide his sexuality.
- Mump (voiced by Robert Tinkler) attends Tekerson Tech and is Gimpy's lead minion and sidekick. He is a short and overweight nerd with glasses. Mump is fiercely protective of his friendship with Gimpy and often agrees with him regardless of whether he should or not. Mump is a member of ROTC.

=== Recurring ===
- Doug "The Duggler" (voiced by Pete Williams) is the resident assistant at the State U dorms where Nitz and Cal reside. He is depicted as a social relic from the 1960s counterculture, sporting an overall stereotypical hippie-like motif. He always wears a bathrobe, which he tells Cal is an unofficial uniform for State U RAs. He is something of a social inept, with a forced way of speaking, refers to himself in the third person, and often denies himself opportunities to partake in unofficial student events and fun. Other students appear indifferent to him.
- Craig (voiced by James Kee) is the leader of Rocko's fraternity Alpha Alpha. He along most of the other fraternity brothers dislikes and has no respect for Rocko due to him being an obnoxious drunk but often takes pity on him.
- Charity (voiced by Katie Griffin) is Jessie's air-head roommate. She is obsessed with her ex-boyfriend Jonah, who left her prior to the series' beginning. She briefly dates Rocko when he tries to use her to make his ex-girlfriend jealous.
- SHE PRIME (voiced by Sunday Muse) is a female hacker at Tekerson Tech. According to the episode guide on the series' official website, her name is Tabitha. After hacking Gimpy, the two of them begin a brief online relationship that ends badly due to Gimpy's self-sabotage. Although they never meet in person, SHE-Prime and Gimpy's dorm rooms are immediately next to one another and are completely oblivious that they are neighbours. It is widely believed that if the show were to have continued, she would have had a love/hate relationship with Gimpy.
- Spud (voiced by Peter Oldring) is a diehard Trekkie and Gimpy's archnemesis. He was the original leader of Tekerson Tech's students, but was overthrown once Gimpy moved into the Tekerson residence.
- Mark, (voiced by Richie Favalaro) the drama guy. He attends State U and is found often by Kimmy's side. Both Kimmy and Nitz are oblivious to the fact Mark is gay (which he makes little attempt to hide).
- Lance, Mark's boyfriend who also attends State U. He is more often than not mentioned by Mark than seen on screen, though he is seen briefly carrying a couch in Roommates and singing showtunes at the end of Screw Week.
- Rob Brodie (voiced by Josh A. Cagan) is one of Jessie's friends. He is a film student who is frequently caught over-hyping whatever he's involved with. He often introduces himself when entering a room, even to people he knows.
- Kruger (voiced by Yannick Bisson) is another of Jessie's friends. Kruger is a foul-mouthed smoker and a pessimist who often disagrees with everyone. Prone to exclaiming "Fuck ___!", the space filled with whatever subject those around him were talking about.
- Dan (voiced by Brian Posehn) is a friend of Jessie's who has no speaking lines in the entire series - all he does is laugh.
- Gimpy's Minions are a troupe of nerds and geeks led by Gimpy at Tekerson Tech, much like a private army. Mump is a nominal second-in-command to Gimpy. Aside from Gimpy and Mump themselves, none of this group are identified by their real names.
- Rita (voiced by Jenny Kim) is the tyrannical Resident Assistant of Gimpy's dorm at Tekerson Tech. She wears glasses, has her hair in a bun and wears an 'RA' armband. Her slippers are shaped like sharks. She dislikes Gimpy and frequently tries to foil his plans. She has a brief fling with Cal when Gimpy uses him to distract her.
- Stoner Dave (voiced by David Herman) is a stereotypical "stoner", recognizable by his black shirt, slouch and abnormally large nose.
- Studious Dave (voiced by Garnet Harding) is a bespectacled ambitious African-American student at State U who is obsessed with finding things that will look good on his application to Wharton.

== Episodes ==
No.	Title	Directed by	Written by	Original release date	Teletoon air date	Prod. code
1	"Party"	Jerry Popowich	Josh A. Cagan	April 22, 2001	June 30, 2001	101
After arriving at college Nitz realises after a week he hasn't done anything so tries to cram a weeks college experiences into a day in order to have something to talk to Kimmy about. Rocko who is making efforts to join the Alpha-Alpha fraternity who is not strictly forbidden from to hazing him decides to haze himself by doing all kinds of stupid things around town but only makes a fool out of himself but still gets into the fraternity after the Alpha-Alpha members take pity on him.
2	"Traditions"	Jerry Popowich	Scott Sonneborn	April 29, 2001	July 1, 2001	102
Tradition Week at the colleges. State U's eXposed eXpo means that during the first snow fall of the winter all of the freshman have to streak through the college quad.
3	"Virgins"	Jerry Popowich	Nahnatchka Khan	May 6, 2001	September 8, 2001	103
Nitz is a virgin but thinks that Kimmy wants to have sex with him when she invites him to the clinic where she works and shows him how to use a condom properly.
4	"New Friends"	Jerry Popowich	Andy Rheingold	May 13, 2001	September 9, 2001	104
Nitz's friends forget about his birthday so he decides to start hanging out with Jessie and her friends. At the same time at Tekerson Tech, Gimpy has lost command of his band of minions and must fight Number One for control.
5	"Drunks"	Jerry Popowich	Josh A. Cagan	June 8, 2001	September 16, 2001	109
Nitz who is underage tries to get into a bar so he can talk to Kimmy. He gets past the bouncer by using a fake ID made by Gimpy who students pay him to make fake ID’s. Rocko vows never to drink again after hallucinating a giant anthropomorphic whiskey bottle.
6	"Roommates"	Jerry Popowich	Julie Rottenberg, Elisa Zuritsky, Josh A. Cagan & Andy Rheingold	June 15, 2001	September 23, 2001	110
After Cal begins to make Nitz go crazy he starts sleeping in Jessie's room, whose roommate has gone for the week. Nitz suddenly realises that he's attracted to Jessie but then tries too hard to get her. Gimpy falls in love with a girl hacker.
7	"Jerks"	Jerry Popowich	Josh A. Cagan	June 22, 2001	September 30, 2001	107
Gimpy, unable to further tolerate Rita's tyranny, enlists Cal to woo her into submission. But the plan works a little too well. Kimmy tells Nitz that she is moving to England so he offers her his travel clock even though he doesn't have one. Rocko drags Nitz around town all night and then destroys the travel clock that Gimpy found for Nitz.
8	"Rivalries"	Jerry Popowich	Brad Sonneborn & Scott Sonneborn	June 29, 2001	October 7, 2001	112
Nitz and Gimpy enter a trivia competition but end up competing against each other in an inter-college competition.
9	"Financial Aid"	Jerry Popowich	Nahnatchka Khan	July 6, 2001	October 14, 2001	113
Nitz does not receive his financial aid check and so joins the local student action group. Rocko joins the local college ROTC.
10	"Identity Crisis"	Jerry Popowich	Josh A. Cagan, Andy Rheingold & Pete Williams	July 22, 2001	October 21, 2001	105
After returning from winter break, nobody seems to remember Nitz so he locks himself in his room to create an identity. Rocko converts Cal into a version of Rocko.
11	"Work Study"	Jerry Popowich	Scott Sonneborn	July 29, 2001	October 28, 2001	111
Nitz receives a credit card from his parents but goes over his limit so must get a job. He ends up working at the library while Rocko, Cal and Gimpy manage to get large amounts of money without trying.
12	"Risk"	Jerry Popowich	Andy Rheingold & Pete Williams	August 5, 2001	November 4, 2001	106
Gimpy finds his Risk board and invites the rest of the clique around for a game. But Nitz has promised Kimmy that he would help at the Spring Fling carnival. Gimpy schemes so that Nitz cannot leave and Nitz's absence causes a fire.
13	"Screw Week"	Jerry Popowich	Josh A. Cagan, Andy Rheingold & Pete Williams	August 12, 2001	November 11, 2001	108
During the final week of college, Nitz tries desperately to attract Kimmy. Jessie becomes more annoyed with Nitz for ignoring her obvious attraction to him.

== Music ==
The theme song, "The Click", is written and performed by the band Good Charlotte, who appear in the episode Risk. Much of the music featured in Undergrads include songs from various indie rock bands and Canadian artists, such as Vibrolux, Alkaline Trio, Knacker, Sam Roberts, Reggie and the Full Effect, Sloan, The Planet Smashers, The Brodys, and The Rosenbergs, among others. The score of the show was composed and produced by Jono Grant. A list of bands and songs used in each episode can be found at the show's official website.

This style of music was also heavily featured in another Decode Entertainment series, Radio Free Roscoe, which had the same music directors as Undergrads.

The American broadcast used different songs by artists such as Linkin Park, Madonna, Kid Rock, Lenny Kravitz, and the Foo Fighters.
