= Frances Nacke Noel =

Labor Activist, Suffragist

- Born: Frances Nacke; January 5, 1873; Saxony, Germany
- Died: April 24, 1963 (aged 90)
- Occupations: Labor activist, suffragist
- Spouse: Primrose Noel

Frances Nacke Noel (January 5, 1873 – April 24, 1963) was a women's labor activist and suffragette, and was known as "the most eloquent female orator of Southern California" in the early 20th century. Nacke acted as one of the primary female labor and suffrage leaders in the Los Angeles labor movement. She was one of the first "progressive activists" to tie to the suffragette movement to the labor movement, thereby achieving mutual goals of emancipation of both women and workers. Through her oration and organization, Nacke was a key contributor to the passing of the suffrage movement in Los Angeles. A large part of Nacke's platform throughout her life was compromising the differences between class divisions in the labor movement.

== Early life ==
Frances Nacke was born January 5, 1873, in Saxony, Germany. She was the eldest of six children. The family lived in the upstairs of a furniture factory in which her father acted as superintendent. In her youth, Nacke's family expected her to take care of her siblings; she also began working at the age of 12. She left Germany at age 20 for New York City, eventually moving to Chicago where she was inundated with the politics of Eugene Debs and socialism. She moved to Denver in 1985, where she interacted with others who shared an interest in the questions of class division and social struggle.

Nacke joined the Socialist Labor party in 1896. She unsuccessfully ran for a position in local Denver government on the socialist ticket.

One isolated incident is said to have ignited Nacke's passion for women's rights and the fight for suffrage. Shortly after her arrival in Denver, Nacke prepared to vote for the first time. Her employer, a former senator's wife, passed out ballots to her employees that were previously marked-in. When Nacke inquired about the peculiarity, the senator's wife explained that young women were not fit to vote. Outraged by that idea, Nacke became a lifelong convert to women's suffrage.

Later that year, Nacke moved to Los Angeles and joined the socialist movement there.

== Labor activism ==
After becoming integrated in the Los Angeles labor movement, Nacke took the helm of leadership roles in several different organizations. She acted as the first chairperson of the Los Angeles Women's Trade Union League, a four-delegate to the Los Angeles Central Labor Council, and a California Social Insurance Commissioner. She organized a women's auxiliary to the California Federation of Labor in 1911.

In 1911, Nacke, as part of The Votes for Women Club, encouraged working women, such as laundry workers, garment workers, waitresses, and saleswomen, to join the suffrage campaign. She effectively brought clubwomen (women who were part of upper class clubs) and wage-earning women together into an unlikely alliance.

Later in 1911, male voters approved full women's suffrage.

The same year, Nacke pushed for the inclusion of Socialist women into Socialist labor groups, which were often gender-exclusive. She called for legislation that would protect wage-earning women. She challenged the California State Federation of Labor's failure to approach women workers in their campaigns, stating that only a few women served as delegates to the organization's conferences. Nacke again preached the importance of cross-gender solidarity.

Her efforts came to fruition on April 15, 1911, as the Central Labor Council held a parade to advocate for the eight-hour work day law for both men and women through downtown Los Angeles. Despite the passing of the law, Nacke found the legislation to be a failure due to its lack of inclusion of a set minimum wage rate for women.

Nacke helped found the nonpartisan Women's Wage League in April 1913. Although the initial plans of the League fizzled out, the city council did follow the path it laid out. They created a committee consisting of four men and two women, among them Frances Nacke, to determine a standard living wage for living in the city. The study eventually led to the governor signing a minimum-wage bill into law in 1913.

In 1914, Nacke helped organize a branch of the Women's Trade Union League (WTUL) in Los Angeles. The branch floundered initially with public female interest, but in early 1915 educational meetings on unemployment and finding employment attracted clubwomen to the struggling chapter. In the aftermath of these meetings, with the help of the Central Labor Council and the socialist city council member Fred Wheeler, the body created a committee dedicated to addressing the unemployment issue in Los Angeles. Later that year she continued her push for cross-class alliances, advocating the admission of female trade unions to the California Federation of Women's Clubs.

Nacke creatively and effectively contributed to the Los Angeles labor movement at Camp Aliso, a recreational camp for working women designed to offer "wholesome recreation." Local WTUL women found low cost, convenient vacations for other working women to escape the rigorous demands of the household and the workplace.

== Later years ==
By 1916 Nacke's direct involvement in cross-class, cross-gender aligning begin to dwindle. Instead she began to focus on consolidating and organizing the female presence in the labor movement. She served as the first chairperson of the Women's Central Committee during the 1920s, attempting to organize wage-earning women and the housewives of union men as the primary consumers in the labor households. Through "purchase power," Nacke argued that women could establish their influence by buying only goods from unionized businesses. In the late 1910s Nacke founded the Conference of Union Women of Southern California, a Women's Annex to the Labor Temple, and a Women's Committee within the Los Angeles Labor Council, furthering her efforts for a single unified working women's movement.

In the late 1920s and 1930s, Nacke shifted her energies on the issue of birth control. She became president of the Los Angeles chapter of the American Birth Control League, establishing one of the first clinics for birth control in the United States. She established the Mother's Clinic in Los Angeles, a health care facility specializing in family planning programs and women's health care. At the time, birth control was largely a middle class movement. Thus, with Nacke's working-class background and labor affiliations, her presence in the movement was most likely unusual. However, her stress on cross-class alliances did not diminish in her later years, still emphasizing the importance of women's cross-class alliances in a 1920 labor yearbook.

== Personal life ==
Nacke married fellow socialist and banker Primrose Noel in her early years in Los Angeles. They had one son together, Francis. Nacke's efforts in the labor movement diminished in the 1940s and 1950s largely due to Primrose's failing health. While taking care of her ailing husband, Noel remained a lifelong advocate for the Los Angeles Labor movement. Noel died on April 24, 1963.
