= Knack (surname) =

Knack is a surname. Notable people with the surname include:

- Andrew Knack, 37th Mayor of Edmonton
- Landon Knack (born 1997), American baseball player
- Lisa Knack (born 1986), German politician
- Olga Brandt-Knack (1885–1978), German politician

== See also ==
- Knaack, Knaak, Knaake, Knack, Knacke, Knak, Knake
