= Knacke =

Knacke may refer to:

- Knäcke, a Swedish crispbread
- 4312 Knacke, a main-belt asteroid
- Christiane Knacke (born 1962), East German swimmer
- Reinhold Knacke (1919–1943), German World War II flying ace

== See also ==
- Knack (disambiguation)
- Knaack, Knaak, Knaake, Knack, Knacke, Knak, Knake
