= Knaack =

Knaack is a German surname. Notable people with the surname include:

- Donald Knaack
- Ernst Knaack (1914-1944), German Communist and resistance fighter
- Joachim Knaack (1933–2012), German biologist and hobby ichthyologist
- Pamela Knaack, German actress

== See also ==
- Knaack, Knaak, Knaake, Knack, Knacke, Knak, Knake
