= Knak =

Knak is a surname. Notable people with the surname include:

- Thomas Knak (born 1973), Danish electronic musician
- Simon Knak (born 2002), Swiss ice hockey player

== See also ==
- Knaack, Knaak, Knaake, Knack, Knacke, Knak, Knake
