= Knake =

Knake is a German surname. Notable people with the surname include:

- Max Knake (born 1973), American football player
- Heidi Knake-Werner, German politician
- Renee Knake Jefferson, American law professor

== See also ==
- KNAK (disambiguation)
- Nake (disambiguation)
- Knaack, Knaak, Knaake, Knack, Knacke, Knak, Knake
