= Nach =

Nach may refer to:

- NACH, National Automation Clearing House
- Nach (Bible acronym), an acronym for Nevi'im Ksuvim/Ktuvim (the Prophets and (Holy) Writings of Tanach)
- Nach (rapper), Spanish rap performance artist Ignacio Fornés Olmo, initially known as Nach Scratch

== See also ==
- Nack (disambiguation)
- Nakh (disambiguation)
