= Chase Atlantic discography =

- Studio albums: 4
- EPs: 7

The discography of Australian music group Chase Atlantic consists of 4 studio albums.

== Albums ==
=== Studio albums ===
Title	Album details	Peak chart positions					Certifications
Title	Album details	AUS	BEL (WA)	NZ	SCO	UK	Certifications
Chase Atlantic	Released: 4 October 2017; Label: Warner Bros. (CD: 558600-2, LP: 93624847915); Formats: CD, LP, digital download, streaming	—	185	—	—	—	MC: Gold; RMNZ: Gold
Phases	Released: 28 June 2019; Label: MDDN, BMG (LP: 4050538506334); Formats: CD, LP, digital download, streaming	—	—	—	—	34	
Beauty in Death	Released: 5 March 2021; Label: Chase Atlantic Music, Fearless (CD: FEAR01635, LP: FEAR01684); Formats: CD, LP, digital download, streaming	—	—	—	60	—	
Lost in Heaven	Released: 1 November 2024; Label: Chase Atlantic Music, Fearless (CD: FEAR04260, LP: FEAR04288); Formats: CD, LP, MC, digital download, streaming	2	—	8	26	88	

== Extended plays ==
Title	Details	Peak chart positions
Title	Details	UK
Dalliancé	Released: 16 May 2014; Formats: Digital download, streaming, LP	—
Nostalgia	Released: 21 February 2015; Formats: Digital download, streaming, LP	—
Paradise	Released: 20 December 2016; Formats: Digital download, streaming, LP	—
Part One	Released: 27 January 2017; Formats: Digital download, streaming	—
Part Two	Released: 31 March 2017; Formats: Digital download, streaming	—
Part Three	Released: 21 July 2017; Formats: Digital download, streaming	—
Don't Try This	Released: 25 January 2019; Formats: Digital download, streaming, LP	44

== Charted and certified singles ==
Title	Year	Peak chart positions					Certifications	Album
Title	Year	GER	NZ Hot	PHL	UK	WW	Certifications	Album
"Meddle About"	2015	—	—	—	—	—	BPI: Silver; RIAA: Gold; RMNZ: Gold	Nostalgia
"Friends"	2015	—	—	—	—	—	BPI: Gold; MC: Platinum; RIAA: Platinum; RMNZ: Platinum	Nostalgia
"Right Here"	2017	—	—	—	—	—	RIAA: Gold	Part One
"Into It"	2017	—	—	—	—	—	BPI: Gold; MC: Platinum; RIAA: Platinum; RMNZ: Gold	Chase Atlantic
"Consume" (featuring Goon des Garcons)	2017	—	—	—	—	—	RIAA: Platinum; RMNZ: Gold	Chase Atlantic
"Okay"	2017	—	—	—	—	—	RIAA: Gold	Chase Atlantic
"Swim"	2018	92	—	60	—	118	BPI: Platinum; MC: 2× Platinum; RIAA: 2× Platinum; RMNZ: 2× Platinum; SNEP: Platinum	Chase Atlantic
"Heaven and Back"	2019	—	—	—	—	—	RIAA: Gold	Phases
"Slow Down"	2020	—	—	—	—	—	BPI: Gold; MC: Gold; RIAA: Gold; RMNZ: Gold	Paradise EP
"Ohmami"	2021	—	—	—	99	—	PMB: Platinum; RIAA: Gold	Beauty in Death (Deluxe Edition)
"Doubt It"	2024	—	12	—	—	—		Lost in Heaven
"Ricochet"	2024	—	21	—	—	—		Lost in Heaven
"You"	2024	—	24	—	—	—		Lost in Heaven
"Facedown"	2025	—	28	—	—	—		Lost in Heaven (High as Hell)
"Remind Me"	2025	—	20	—	—	—		Lost in Heaven (High as Hell)
"Warcry"	2025	—	18	—	—	—		Lost in Heaven (High as Hell)
