= Atlas Arena =

Multipurpose indoor arena in Łódź, Poland

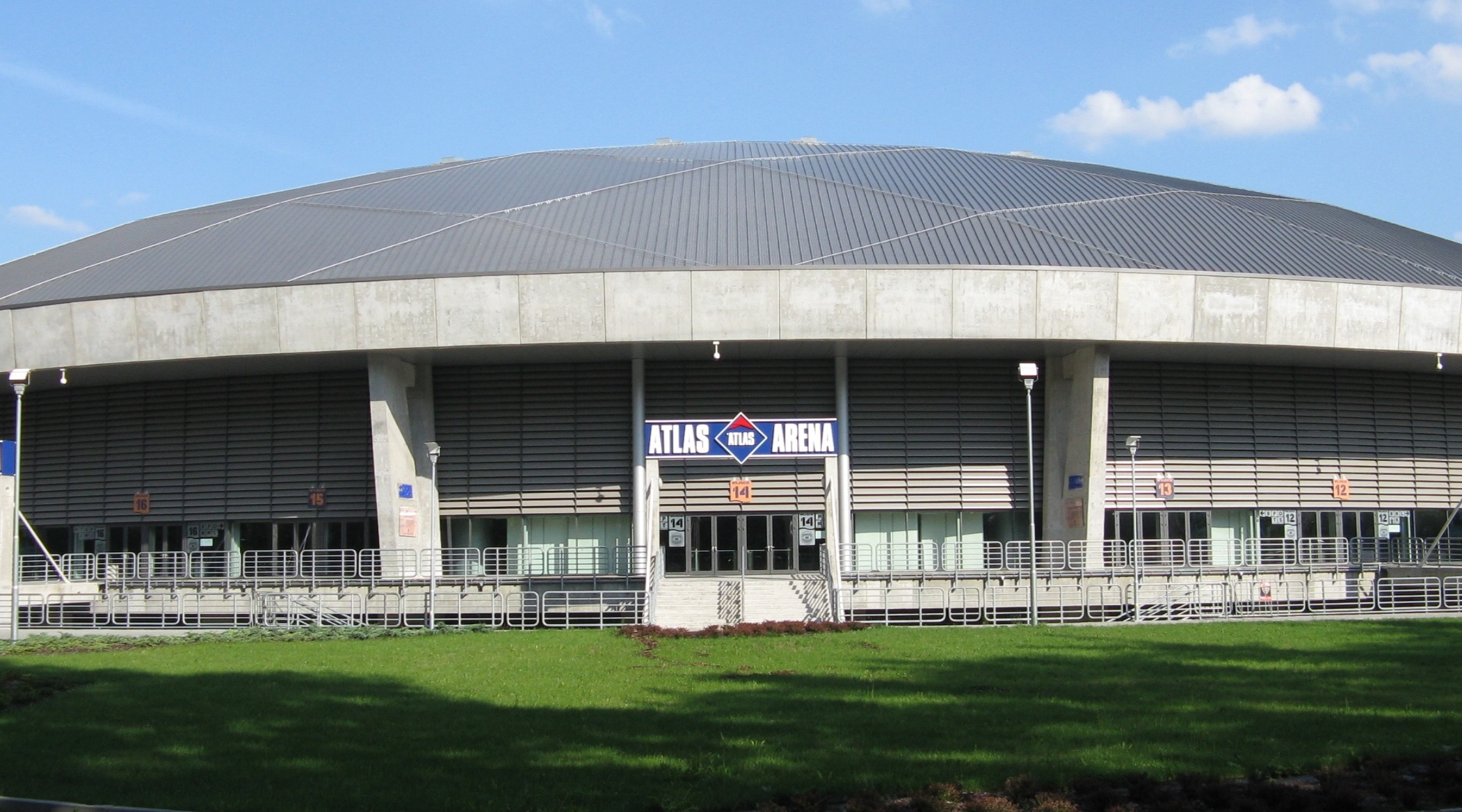
- Front view
- Interactive map of Atlas Arena
- Location: aleja Bandurskiego 7, 94-020 Łódź, Poland
- Coordinates: 51°45′25″N 19°25′30″E
- Owner: City of Łódź
- Operator: Miejska Arena Kultury i Sportu
- Seating type: Reserved seating
- Capacity: 14,728

Construction
- Built: 2006–2009
- Opened: June 26, 2009
- Cost: € 80 million
- Architect: ATJ Architekci
- Main contractors: Varitex; Mostostal; Skanska

Website
- www.atlasarena.pl

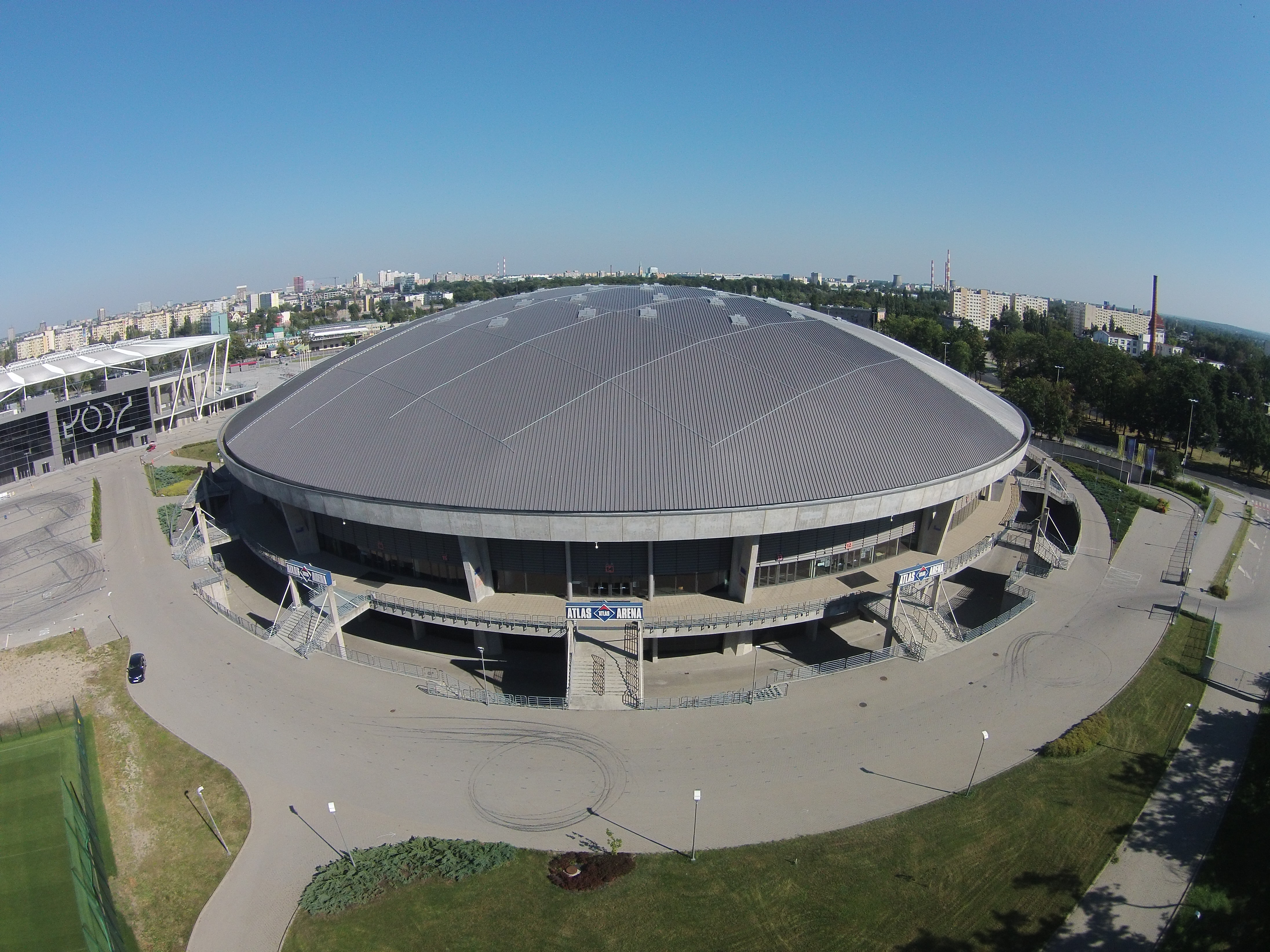
Aerial view

Atlas Arena is a multipurpose indoor arena in Łódź, Poland, opened on June 26, 2009 at Bandurskiego Avenue. It is one of the largest Polish venues with a seating capacity of 10,400, with an optional extra 3,000, it has 1,500 parking places and 11 VIP lounges (each with a terrace). The arena hosts conferences, concerts and sports events (e.g. volleyball, basketball, athletics and ice hockey). In August 2009, Atlas Group purchased the naming rights to the arena for a period of 5 years.

== Events ==
=== Sports events ===
- CEV Champions League (PGE Skra Bełchatów as a host)
- 2010 CEV Champions League Final Four
- Eurobasket Women 2011
- 2012 CEV Champions League Final Four
- 2014 FIVB Volleyball Women's World Championship qualification (CEV)
- 2014 FIVB Volleyball Men's World Championship
- 2019 Women's European Volleyball Championship
- 2022 FIVB Women's Volleyball World Championship (First round, Second round)

=== Concerts ===
Concerts at Atlas Arena
Date	Artist	Tour	Attendance
25 October 2009	Alexandrov Ensemble		—N/a
17 November 2009	A-ha	Foot of the Mountain Tour	—N/a
10 February 2010	Depeche Mode	Tour of the Universe	31,064
11 February 2010	Depeche Mode	Tour of the Universe	
12 March 2010	Rammstein	Liebe ist für alle da Tour	13,996
14 March 2010	Tokio Hotel	Humanoid City World Tour	—N/a
11 April 2011	Slayer + Megadeth	World Painted Blood Tour	—N/a
18 April 2011	Roger Waters	The Wall Live	26,231
19 April 2011	Roger Waters	The Wall Live	
17 May 2011	Shakira	The Sun Comes Out World Tour	—N/a
7 November 2011	Thirty Seconds to Mars	Into the Wild Tour	—N/a
8 November 2011	Thirty Seconds to Mars	Into the Wild Tour	—N/a
11 November 2011	Sade	Sade Live	—N/a
6 December 2011	Rihanna	Loud Tour	—N/a
29 April 2012	Andrea Bocelli		—N/a
7 July 2012	Elton John	Greatest Hits Tour	—N/a
12 September 2012	Il Divo		—N/a
21 November 2012	Sting	Back to Bass Tour	—N/a
23 November 2012	Muse	The 2nd Law World Tour	—N/a
14 December 2012	Smokie		—N/a
25 March 2013	Justin Bieber	Believe Tour	—N/a
8 May 2013	Mark Knopfler	Privateering Tour	—N/a
7 June 2013	Eric Clapton		—N/a
18 June 2013	Green Day	99 Revolutions Tour	—N/a
25 June 2013	Toto	35th Anniversary Tour	—N/a
3 July 2013	Iron Maiden	Maiden England World Tour	13,836
19 July 2013	Leonard Cohen	Old Ideas World Tour	—N/a
13 August 2013	System of a Down	System of a Down Reunion Tour	—N/a
24 February 2014	Depeche Mode	Delta Machine Tour	15,764
7 May 2014	Charles Aznavour		
9 May 2014	André Rieu		7,553
12 May 2014	Peter Gabriel		—N/a
4 June 2014	Avenged Sevenfold		—N/a
11 June 2014	Black Sabbath	Black Sabbath Reunion Tour	—N/a
12 June 2014	Aerosmith	Global Warming Tour	—N/a
28 September 2014	Il Divo		—N/a
30 October 2014	Kylie Minogue	Kiss Me Once Tour	—N/a
21 November 2014	Chicago Blues Brothers		7,000
15 December 2014	Lenny Kravitz	Strut Europe Tour 2014	—N/a
29 March 2015	Violetta	Violetta Live	—N/a
5 May 2015	Scorpions	Return to Forever/50th Anniversary Tour	—N/a
29 May 2015	André Rieu		—N/a
27 June 2015	Judas Priest	Redeemer of Souls Tour	—N/a
10 October 2015	Metro		—N/a
17 October 2015	Lady Pank		—N/a
25 October 2015	Deep Purple	Now What? World Tour	—N/a
20 November 2015	Slash	World on Fire World Tour	—N/a
21 November 2015	Alexandrov Ensemble		—N/a
12 December 2015	Florence and the Machine	How Big Tour	—N/a
2 February 2016	Imagine Dragons	Smoke + Mirrors Tour	—N/a
18 March 2016	Macklemore & Ryan Lewis	Part II: A European Tour	—N/a
1 May 2016	Hans Zimmer	Live On Tour 2016	—N/a
28 May 2016	Rod Stewart	The Hits 2016	—N/a
3 June 2016	André Rieu		—N/a
7 June 2016	Korn + Megadeth + Sixx:A.M.	Power Festival 2016	—N/a
20 October 2016	The Cure	The Cure Tour 2016	—N/a
5 November 2016	Jean-Michel Jarre	Electronica World Tour 2016	—N/a
23 May 2017	Deep Purple		—N/a
6 November 2017	Queen + Adam Lambert	Queen + Adam Lambert Tour 2017–2018	—N/a
9 February 2018	Depeche Mode	Global Spirit Tour	14,270
15 February 2019	Twenty One Pilots	The Bandito Tour	—N/a
24 February 2019	Nicki Minaj, Juice WRLD	The Nicki Wrld Tour	—N/a
13 April 2022	Louis Tomlinson	Louis Tomlinson World Tour 2022	—N/a
3 June 2022	KISS	End Of The Road World Tour	—N/a
30 April 2023	Avril Lavigne	Love Sux Tour	—N/a
11 September 2023	Louis Tomlinson	Faith In The Future World Tour 2023	—N/a
29 October 2023	50 Cent	The Final Lap Tour	—N/a
~~8 March 2024~~	Celine Dion	Courage World Tour	—N/a
18 March 2024	Niall Horan	The Show: Live on Tour	13,864 / 13,991
15 October 2024	Melanie Martinez	The Trilogy Tour	—N/a
21 February 2025	Cyndi Lauper	Girls Just Wanna Have Fun Farewell Tour	—N/a
16 March 2025	Alan Walker	The Walkerworld Tour	—N/a
9 April 2025	Twenty One Pilots	The Clancy World Tour	—N/a
16 April 2025	Chase Atlantic	Lost in Heaven Tour	—N/a
6 June 2025	Tate McRae	Miss Possessive Tour	—N/a
25 June 2025	Thirty Seconds to Mars	Seasons Tour	—N/a
8 October 2025	Flo Rida	Club Can’t Handle UK & Europe Tour	—N/a
6 December 2025	Lorde	Ultrasound World Tour	—N/a
22 January 2026	RAYE	This Tour May Contain New Music	—N/a
14 March 2026	Various performers	K-Pop Forever!	—N/a
22 April 2026	5 Seconds of Summer	Everyone's a Star! World Tour	—N/a
31 May 2026	Ne-Yo & Akon	Nights Like This Tour	—N/a
10 September 2026	Hollywood Vampires (band)	2026 European Tour	—N/a

== See also ==
- List of indoor arenas in Poland
- Sport in Poland

Events and tenants
Preceded by O2 Arena (Czech Republic) Prague	CEV Champions League; Final Venue; 2010	Succeeded by PalaOnda (Italy) Bolzano
Preceded by PalaOnda (Italy) Bolzano	CEV Champions League; Final Venue; 2012	Succeeded by Sports-Concerts Complex Viktora Blinova (Russia) Omsk
