= Jason Owen =

Jason Owen may refer to:

- Jason Owen (singer) (born c. 1994), Australian singer
- Jason Owen (talent manager) (born c. 1976), American music talent manager
