= Ohmami =

2021 single by Chase Atlantic

- Standard cover

Single by Chase Atlantic

from the album Beauty in Death (Deluxe Edition)
- Released: June 25, 2021
- Genre: Latin pop; R&B
- Length: 3:46
- Label: Fearless
- Songwriters: Christian Anthony; Clinton Cave; Mitchel Cave
- Producer: Chase Atlantic

Chase Atlantic singles chronology
"Hurts 2 Hate Somebody" (2021)	"Ohmami" and "Ohmami (with Maggie Lindemann)" (2021)	"Escort" (2021)

Music video
- "Ohmami" on YouTube

Alternative cover
- Remix cover

"Ohmami" (styled in all caps) is a single by Australian R&B band Chase Atlantic. It was released on June 25, 2021, through Fearless Records.

== Background and promotion ==
In March 2021, the group released their third studio album Beauty in Death. They released Ohmami on June 25, 2021, which the song was described as containing heavy Spanish beats and fusing latin pop and r&b together. The group later embarked on their North American headline tour to further promote the album. On 12 August 2021, they released the music video for the song, which had a story reminiscent of Blow, The Wolf of Wall Street, and Grand Theft Auto: Vice City. Originally released as a standalone single, the song was featured in the deluxe edition of Beauty in Death. In September 2021, the group released a remix of the song with American singer Maggie Lindemann.

== Chart performance and certifications ==
"Ohmami" chart performance
Chart	Peak position
UK Singles (Official Charts)	99

"Ohmami" certifications
Association	Certification	Reference
Pro-Música Brasil	Platinum	
Recording Industry Association of America	Gold	
