= Lost in Heaven Tour =

2024–25 concert tour by Chase Atlantic

Lost In Heaven Tour
- World tour by Chase Atlantic
- Promotional poster for the North American leg of the tour.
- Location: Europe; North America; Oceania; Asia; South America
- Associated album: Lost in Heaven
- Start date: 16 October 2024
- End date: 19 November 2025
- Legs: 5
- No. of shows: 51
- Supporting acts: 24kGoldn; Xavier Mayne; Elio

Chase Atlantic concert chronology
- Cold Nights Tour (2022); Lost in Heaven Tour (2024–25)

The Lost in Heaven Tour is a concert tour by Australian pop-R&B band Chase Atlantic, in support of their fourth studio album, Lost in Heaven.

The North American leg was announced on 20 August 2024, along with the announcement of their fourth studio album. The Oceania leg was announced on 16 September 2024, Europe leg on 14 October 2024, Asia leg on 25 June 2025, and the South America leg on 2 September 2025. The tour began on 16 October 2024, in Irving, Texas and concluded on 19 November 2025 in Buenos Aires, Argentina.

== Set list ==
The following set list was first performed in Texas on 16 October 2024, and last performed on 19 November 2025, in Buenos Aires, Argentina.

1. "Die for Me"
2. "Slow Down"
3. "Consume"
4. "Ricochet"
5. "The Walls"
6. "What U Call That"
7. "Doubt It" (Note: Performed during the South America leg of the tour, replacing "What U Call That.")
8. "Ohmami"
9. "Favela"
10. "Heaven and Back"
11. "Warcry" (Note: Performed during the South America leg of the tour, replacing "Demon Time" and "Night Calls.")
12. "Demon Time"
13. "Night Calls"
14. "Into It"
15. "Okay"
16. "Beauty in Death"
17. "You"
18. "I Don't Like Darkness"
19. "Mess Me Up"
20. "Disconnected" (Note: Performed during the Europe and the South America leg of the tour, replacing "Mess Me Up".)
21. "Church"
22. "Swim"
23. "Facedown" (Note: Performed only during Summer Sonic on the Asia leg and during the South America leg of the tour)
  Encore
24. "Friends"

== Tour dates ==
List of 2024 concerts, showing date, city, country, venue, and opening act
Date	City	Country	Venue	Opening acts
16 October 2024	Irving	United States	Toyota Music Factory	24kGoldn
17 October 2024	Houston	United States	Bayou Music Center	24kGoldn
18 October 2024	San Antonio	United States	Boeing Center at Tech Port	24kGoldn
20 October 2024	Orlando	United States	Hard Rock Live	24kGoldn
21 October 2024	St. Petersburg	United States	Duke Energy Center for the Arts	24kGoldn
23 October 2024	Atlanta	United States	Coca-Cola Roxy	24kGoldn
24 October 2024	Nashville	United States	Municipal Auditorium	24kGoldn
26 October 2024	Raleigh	United States	Red Hat Amphitheater	24kGoldn
27 October 2024	Washington, D.C.	United States	The Anthem	24kGoldn
28 October 2024	Brooklyn (Note: Promoted as New York City.)	United States	Barclays Center	24kGoldn
30 October 2024	Philadelphia	United States	Metropolitan Opera House	24kGoldn
1 November 2024	Boston	United States	MGM Music Hall at Fenway	24kGoldn
3 November 2024	Montreal	Canada	M Telus	24kGoldn
5 November 2024	Etobicoke (Note: Promoted as Toronto.)	Canada	The Theatre at Great Canadian Casino Resort	24kGoldn
6 November 2024	Detroit	United States	The Fillmore	24kGoldn
8 November 2024	Chicago	United States	Byline Bank Aragon Ballroom	24kGoldn
9 November 2024	Minneapolis	United States	The Fillmore	24kGoldn
12 November 2024	Denver	United States	Fillmore Auditorium	24kGoldn
13 November 2024	Salt Lake City	United States	Rockwell @ The Complex	24kGoldn
15 November 2024	Las Vegas	United States	House of Blues	24kGoldn
16 November 2024	Phoenix	United States	Arizona Financial Theatre	24kGoldn
19 November 2024	Los Angeles	United States	Hollywood Palladium	24kGoldn
20 November 2024	Los Angeles	United States	Hollywood Palladium	24kGoldn
7 December 2024	Auckland	New Zealand	Spark Arena	24kGoldn; Xavier Mayne
11 December 2024	Melbourne	Australia	Sidney Myer Music Bowl	24kGoldn; Xavier Mayne
12 November 2024	Sydney	Australia	Qudos Bank Arena	24kGoldn; Xavier Mayne
15 November 2024	Brisbane	Australia	Riverstage	24kGoldn; Xavier Mayne
18 November 2024	Adelaide	Australia	Adelaide Entertainment Centre	24kGoldn; Xavier Mayne
20 November 2024	Perth	Australia	HBF Stadium	24kGoldn; Xavier Mayne

List of 2025 concerts, showing date, city, country, venue, and opening act
Date	City	Country	Venue	Opening acts
12 April 2025	Hamburg	Germany	Alsterdorfer Sporthalle	Xaiver Mayne
13 April 2025	Frederiksberg (Note: Promoted as Copenhagen.)	Denmark	K.B. Hallen	Xaiver Mayne
15 April 2025	Prague	Czech Republic	Sportovní hala Fortuna	Xaiver Mayne
16 April 2025	Łódź	Poland	Atlas Arena	Xaiver Mayne
18 April 2025	Berlin	Germany	Uber Arena	Xaiver Mayne
20 April 2025	Cologne	Germany	Lanxess Arena	Xaiver Mayne
22 April 2025	Paris	France	Le Zénith	Xaiver Mayne
23 April 2025	Paris	France	Le Zénith	Xaiver Mayne
24 April 2025	Amsterdam	Netherlands	AFAS Live	Xaiver Mayne
26 April 2025	Brussels	Belgium	Forest National	Xaiver Mayne
28 April 2025	Amsterdam	Netherlands	AFAS Live	Xaiver Mayne
30 April 2025	Glasgow	Scotland	The OVO Hydro	Xaiver Mayne
2 May 2025	Manchester	England	Co-op Live	Xaiver Mayne
4 May 2025	London	England	The O_{2} Arena	Xaiver Mayne
15 August 2025	Koto City	Japan	Toyosu PIT	-
16 August 2025	Chiba City	Japan	ZOZO Marine Stadium & Makuhari Messe	-
17 August 2025	Osaka	Japan	Summer Sonic Festival	-
9 November 2025	São Paulo	Brazil	Suhai Music Hall	Xaiver Mayne
11 November 2025	Porto Alegre	Brazil	KTO Arena	Xaiver Mayne
13 November 2025	Rio de Janeiro	Brazil	Qualistage	Xaiver Mayne
17 November 2025	Santiago	Chile	Movistar Arena	Xaiver Mayne
19 November 2025	Buenos Aires	Argentina	C Art Media	Xaiver Mayne

== Personnel ==
Chase Atlantic

- Mitchel Cave – lead vocals
- Christian Anthony – lead vocals, rhythm guitar
- Clinton Cave – lead guitar, tenor saxophone, backing vocals

Touring members

- Patrick Wilde – guitar, bass
- Jesse Boyle – drums, percussion
- Ben "Benchiki" Chambers - production
