= What About Tonight =

Former Australian boy band

- Origin: Sydney, Australia
- Genre: Pop
- Years active: 2012–2016
- Labels: Sony; Independent
- Spinoffs: Chase Atlantic
- Past members: Christian Anthony; Mitchel Cave; Tyrone Georgiadis; Luke Howell; Brock Jays; Wade Smith
- Website: whatabouttonightmusic.com

What About Tonight were an Australian boy band formed early in 2012 by Christian Anthony, Mitchel Cave, Tyrone Georgiadis, Luke Howell and Brock Jays. They reached the top 12 contestants on the fourth season of The X Factor Australia . After being the second contestant eliminated, the members returned to their respective home towns. A trimmed line-up of Jays, Georgiadis and Howell were joined by Wade Smith early in 2013. They issued a single, "Time of Our Lives" (July 2013), which peaked at No. 25 on the ARIA singles chart. After leaving What About Tonight, Anthony and Cave formed an alternative R&B trio, Chase Atlantic in 2014.

== 2012: Foundation to The X Factor ==
Early in 2012 What About Tonight were formed as a pop music, boy band by five Australian vocalists, Christian Anthony (15 years old, from Sydney), Mitchel Cave (15, Cairns), Tyrone Georgiadis (18, Sydney), Luke Howell (18, Gold Coast) and Brock Jays (19, Wangaratta). The members had met via their YouTube accounts and watching each other's music videos. Jays recalled how upon meeting physically, "[Anthony] said 'What about tonight we get haircuts' and I replied with 'Hey why don't we call ourselves What About Tonight?'"

They auditioned for Australian TV talent quest, The X Factor, singing We the Kings' "Say You Like Me". At the boot-camp in London, What About Tonight sang for One Direction and that group's Louis Tomlinson stated, "they're just like us." For the band's first live show on The X Factor they performed the Wanted's "Glad You Came". For the second live show they sang Busted's "Year 3000", performing the Jonas Brothers' variation. In mid-September The Sydney Morning Herald's Jo Casamento reported that What About Tonight were being sued by David Caplice and Alfred Tuohey, talent managers, who alleged they had "manufactured them for months before the show." A week earlier Howell had declared, "We all met through YouTube. Mitchel's older brother Clinton found us and we skyped each other, we literally met four days before the audition." However, an unnamed source told Casamento that Caplice and Tuohey had cast What About Tonight, "from huge auditions they held around the country, they developed it, they named it, they trained the boys and they gave them the opportunity."

On 26 September 2012 the group were placed in the bottom two positions, vying against Nathaniel Willemse. The group sang Michael Jackson's "The Way You Make Me Feel". Judges Natalie Bassingthwaighte and Guy Sebastian voted to send them home, while Ronan Keating and Melanie Brown voted to send Willemse home. The result was determined by public votes, with What About Tonight eliminated. The group had "received the least number of votes of all 11 acts." Competing explanations were provided for their unexpected low vote, "[they] were competing for votes with the other boy band The Collective," "[our] fans are so young they may not have had the access to the credit needed to vote" or "viewer backlash" after "a music manager has reportedly alleged that he formed the band months before the show."

The group issued their rendition of "Glad You Came" as a single, via Sony Music Australia, which peaked at No. 8 on the ARIA Hitseekers singles chart, in September 2012. Their next single, "Year 3000" reached the ARIA singles chart top 100 in October. The group members returned to their respective home towns to visit their families. However, before Christmas that year they reunited.

== 2013–2016: "Time of Our Lives" ==
In early 2013 What About Tonight provided a cover version of "When You Look Me in the Eyes" by the Jonas Brothers. In late January, Smallzy of Nova FM announced their tour with two Australasian bands, Titanium and At Sunset, starting in February. While touring, At Sunset and What About Tonight provided a twitcam to announce their combined tour in April around Australia. During an in-store tour and meet-and-greet, What About Tonight performed their singles, "How Do You not Know" and "Drop Dead for Your Love". Anthony and Cave left the group due to educational commitments, while the rest of the group searched for a new member. By mid-2013 the line-up became a four-piece with Jays, Georgiadis and Howell joined by Wade Smith (The Voice contestant).

They issued their next single, "Time of Our Lives", independently in July 2013, which peaked at No. 25 on the ARIA singles chart. The song was co-written by Sean Mullins, his partner Cassie Davis and her younger brother Joseph Davis. The music video for "Time of Our Lives" was shot in Phuket, Thailand. The four members are shown, "jet skiing, jumping on motorbikes, riding fast speed boats and of course, dropping in on a go-go bar."

In August-September they joined The Salvation Army's Oasis Youth Support Network and undertook an east coast tour of schools to raise awareness of homelessness. What About Tonight joined Jane the Virgin's Justin Baldoni in January 2016 to promote Skid Row Carnival of Love in Los Angeles.

== Afterwards ==
While still a member of What About Tonight, Mitchel Cave performed with his older brother Clinton on the latter's YouTube channel. The brothers formed an alternative R&B trio, Chase Atlantic, in 2014 with What About Tonight bandmate, Christian Anthony. That group were signed by the Madden Brothers and subsequently worked in both Australia and United States.

From August 2016 Tyrone Georgiadis was a mixed martial arts bantamweight fighter. In 2019 Brock Jays, performing as pop singer Jays, signed with TMRW Music and released his solo single, "Misfits". "Stuck on You" (June 2020) is the debut single from Luke Howell.
