= Lost in Heaven =

Studio album by Chase Atlantic
- Released: 1 November 2024
- Recorded: 2023–2024
- Genres: Alternative R&B; pop-rock
- Length: 44:03
- Label: Fearless
- Producers: Benchiki; Chase Atlantic; Austin Hull; Tricky Stewart

Chase Atlantic chronology
Beauty in Death (2021)	Lost in Heaven (2024)

Singles from Lost in Heaven
- 1. "Mamacita" Released: 26 September 2023; 2. "Die for Me" Released: 23 August 2024; 3. "Doubt It" Released: 20 September 2024

Lost in Heaven is the fourth studio album by alternative-R&B trio Chase Atlantic, released on 1 November 2024 through Fearless Records. The album was announced on 20 September 2024, with the release of the third single from the album, "Doubt It".

The album was promoted through three singles; "Mamacita", "Die for Me" and "Doubt It". The band has embarked on the Lost in Heaven Tour to promote the album, with stops in North America, Europe and Oceania.

The deluxe edition of Lost in Heaven, titled Lost in Heaven (High as Hell), was released on 3 October 2025. It was preceded by two singles, "Facedown," released on 14 August 2025, and "Remind Me," released on 12 September 2025. The edition also includes two additional tracks, "Warcry" and "Victory Lap," the latter featuring alternative rock singer De'Wayne, and Australian singer-songwriter Larissa Lambert.

== Background and recording ==
Following the release of their 2021 album, Beauty in Death, Chase Atlantic continued to develop their signature sound while diving deeper into darker and more introspective themes. According to band member Christian Anthony, the album reflects the trio's emotional struggles, feelings of isolation, and the challenges they faced despite their growing success. The production of Lost in Heaven took place primarily in Los Angeles, where the band experimented with new sonic textures while maintaining their signature alternative R&B aesthetic.

== Critical reception ==
Professional ratings
Review scores
Source	Rating
The Rice Thresher	3.5/5 stars
PitPass	7.5/10
The Smoke Signal	A

Lost in Heaven received generally positive reviews from music critics. The album was praised for its atmospheric production, thematic depth, and consistency with Chase Atlantic's established style.

Multiple publications reviewed Lost in Heaven, offering a range of perspectives. UIC Radio described the album as "introspective, reflecting themes of loneliness and emotional struggle despite the band's growing popularity", highlighting tracks such as "Ricochet" and "You" for their lyrical content. The Rice Thresher noted that while the album "remains consistent with Chase Atlantic's established style, it offers limited innovation beyond their previous work". WNUR Wavelength characterised the album as "a blend of alternative R&B, pop, and rock influences, exploring themes such as depression and passion". Meanwhile, Pitpass commented on the album's "cinematic atmosphere and recurring motifs of dark romance", commending its genre fusion and production style.

== Track listing ==
All tracks are written by Christian Anthony, Clinton Cave & Mitchel Cave except where noted; all music is produced by Chase Atlantic & Seth Drake, except where noted.

Lost in Heaven track listing
No.	Title	Writer(s)	Producer(s)	Length
1.	"Favela"		Chase Atlantic; Seth Drake; Benchiki	3:44
2.	"Die for Me"			3:27
3.	"Ricochet"			3:18
4.	"You"			3:33
5.	"Demon Time"			2:48
6.	"Night Calls"			1:28
7.	"Disconnected"			4:11
8.	"Hours Lost"			3:50
9.	"Mess Me Up" (featuring Xavier Mayne)	Christian Anthony; Clinton Cave; Mitchel Cave; Xavier Mayne		3:28
10.	"Amy"		Chase Atlantic; S. Drake; Austin Hull	3:19
11.	"Doubt It"			3:28
12.	"Mamacita"	C. Anthony; C. Cave; M. Cave; Tricky Stewart	Chase Atlantic; S. Drake; Tricky Stewart	3:23
13.	"Don't Laugh"		Chase Atlantic; S. Drake; T. Stewart	4:06
Total length:				41:44

== Personnel ==
Credits adapted from the digital liner notes of Lost in Heaven.

Chase Atlantic

- Christian Anthony - lead vocals, guitars, production, synthesiser
- Clinton Cave - guitars, production, synthesiser, drum programming, saxophone
- Mitchel Cave - lead vocals, bass, guitars, production, synthesiser

Additional personnel

- Seth Drake - synthesiser, production
- Tricky Stewart - production (12, 13)
- Benchiki - production (1)
- Xavier Mayne - guest vocals (9)
- Austin Hull - production (10)

== Charts ==
Chart performance for Lost in Heaven
Chart (2024–2025)	Peak position
Australian Albums (ARIA)	4
New Zealand Albums (RMNZ)	8
Portuguese Albums (AFP)	146
Scottish Albums (Official Charts)	26
UK Albums (Official Charts)	88

== Release history ==
Release history and formats for Lost in Heaven
Region	Date	Format	Label
Worldwide	1 November 2024	Digital download; streaming	Fearless Records
Worldwide	28 March 2025	CD; vinyl; cassette	Fearless Records
