= The X Factor (Australian TV series) season 4 =

The X Factor
- Season 4
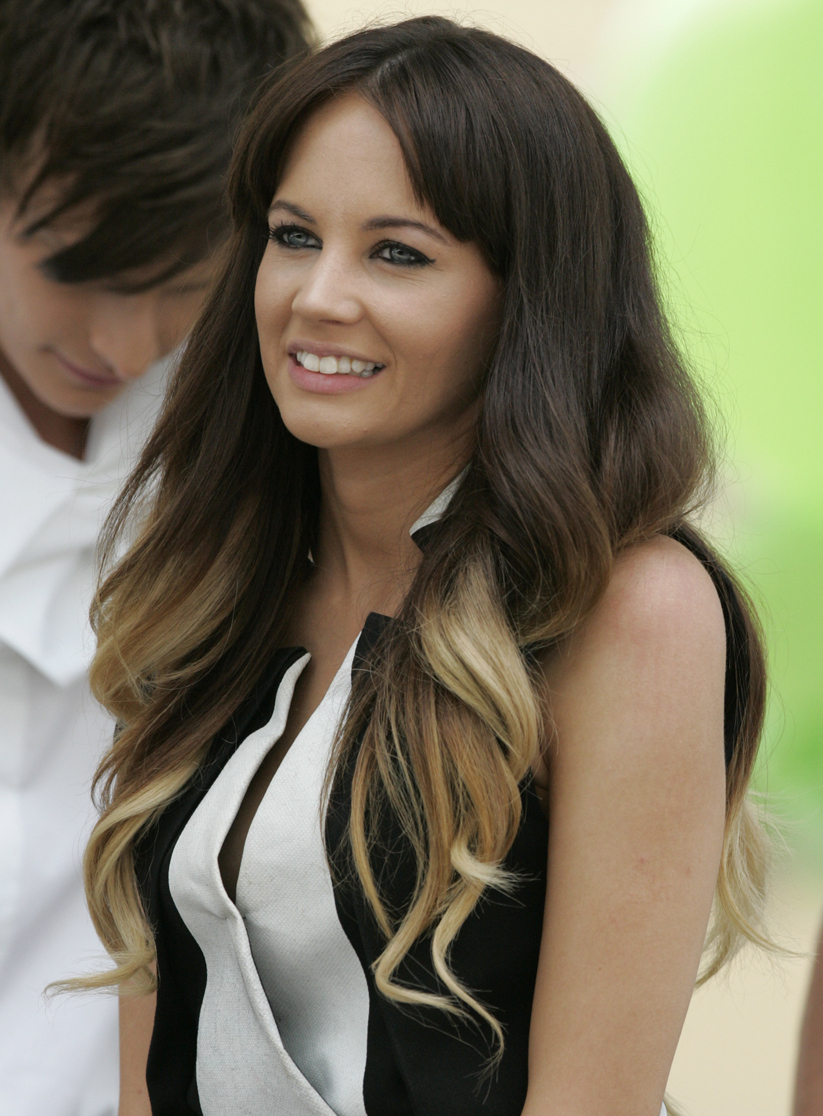
- Hosted by: Luke Jacobz (The X Factor)
- Judges: Mel B; Guy Sebastian; Natalie Bassingthwaighte; Ronan Keating
- Winner: Samantha Jade
- Winning mentor: Guy Sebastian
- Runner-up: Jason Owen

Release
- Original network: Seven Network
- Original release: 20 August – 20 November 2012

Season chronology
- ← Previous; Season 3 Next → Season 5

The X Factor was an Australian television reality music competition, based on the original UK series, to find new singing talent; the winner of which received a Sony Music Australia recording contract and a new car. The fourth season premiered on the Seven Network on 20 August 2012 and ended on 20 November 2012. The winner was Samantha Jade and her winner's single "What You've Done to Me" was released after the final. Jade was mentored throughout by Guy Sebastian, who won as mentor for the second year in a row. The main live shows was presented by Luke Jacobz, while season three finalist Johnny Ruffo presented the digital live streaming show The X Stream. Mel B, Guy Sebastian, Natalie Bassingthwaighte and Ronan Keating returned as judges.

The competition was split into several stages: auditions, super bootcamp, home visits and live shows. Auditions in front of the show's producers took place throughout February and March 2012. The successful auditionees chosen by the producers were then invited back to the last set of auditions that took place in front of the judges and a live studio audience in May 2012. After the auditions was super bootcamp, where all four judges worked together and collectively chose 24 acts, including six from each of the four categories: Boys, Girls, Over 25s and Groups. Following super bootcamp was the home visits stage, where each of the judges reduced their six acts to three, with help from guest mentors Alicia Keys, Kesha, One Direction and Usher. The live shows began on 17 September 2012.

The fourth season sparked controversy when contestant Josh Brookes was disqualified from The X Factor for behaving "in an inappropriate manner" on social media. He was later replaced by Carmelo Munzone. The grand final decider was watched by 1.92 million people, making it the highest rated television episode of the season.

== Judges ==
Season 4 judges

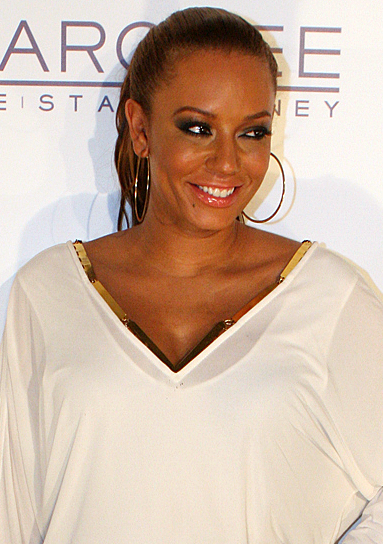
Mel B

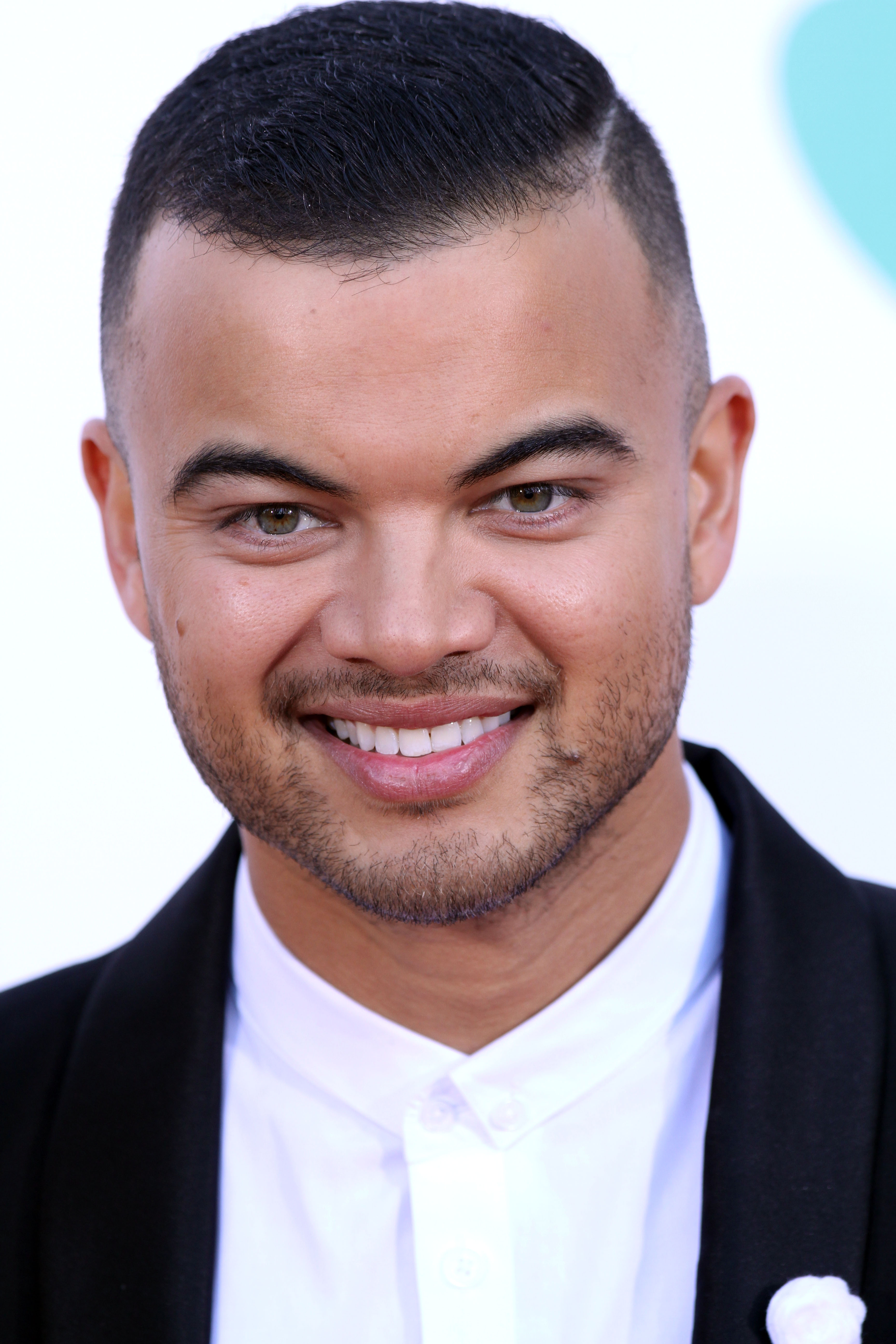
Guy Sebastian

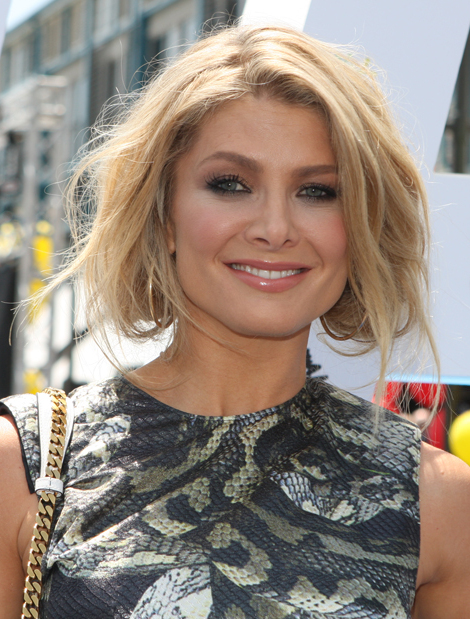
Natalie Bassingthwaighte

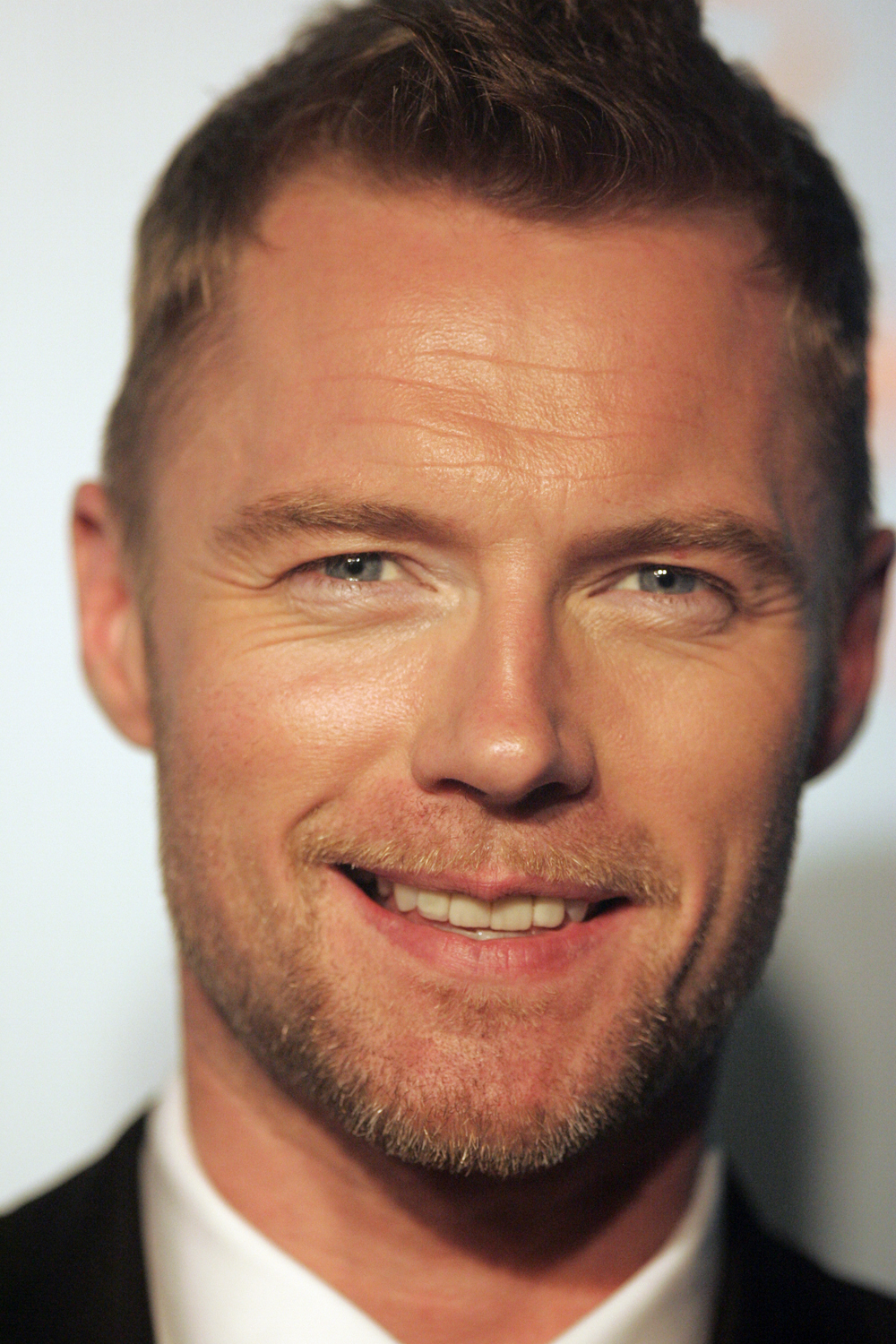
Ronan Keating

In 2012 it was confirmed that Mel B, Sebastian, Bassingthwaighte and Keating would return for the series.

== Selection process ==
=== Auditions ===
Cities that auditions were held in.

Auditions in front of the show's producers began in February 2012 in seven cities: Hobart (Hotel Grand Chancellor, 18 February), Launceston (Hotel Grand Chancellor, 19 February), Albury (Albury Entertainment Centre, 22 February), Dubbo (RSL Club Resort, 24 February), Darwin (Crowne Plaza Hotel, 26 February), Cairns (Shangri-La Hotel, The Marina Cairns, 28 February), Brisbane (Suncorp Piazza, 3–4 March), Newcastle (Hunter Stadium, 7 March), Sydney (Sydney Convention and Exhibition Centre, 10–12 March), Perth (Perth Convention and Exhibition Centre, 18 March), Adelaide (Adelaide Convention Centre, 20 March) and Melbourne (Flemington Racecourse, 24–26 March). Online auditions were also introduced into the season for the acts who missed out on auditioning in front of the producers. The successful auditionees chosen by the producers were then invited back to the last set of auditions that took place in front of the judges and a live studio audience. These auditions were held in three cities: Melbourne (Hisense Arena, 3–5 May), Gold Coast (Gold Coast Convention and Exhibition Centre, 11–12 May) and Sydney (Sydney Entertainment Centre, 17–19 May).

=== Super bootcamp ===
The super bootcamp stage of the competition saw all four judges working together, unlike in previous series where they disband to manage their own categories. It was filmed on 28, 29 and 30 May 2012. The first day saw the judges split the acts into four categories: Boys, Girls, Over 25s and Groups. Each category was given a list of four songs which they had to choose from to perform for the judges. At the end of the day, a third of the acts were sent home. On the second day, the remaining 74 acts were put into ensembles and were each given a song which they had to learn and perform for the judges. Each ensemble received vocal coaching from Gary Pinto and choreography practice from Squared Division. At the end of day, the judges sent 28 acts home. On the third day, the remaining 46 acts each individually performed one song to a live audience of one thousand. On the fourth day of super bootcamp, the judges narrowed down the acts to 24. Five from the Boys and six rejected soloists from the Girls categories were asked by the judges to form two groups, The Collective (boy band) and Black Ivory (girl band).

The 24 successful acts were:

- Boys: Josh Brookes, Matt Cenere, Matt Gresham, Adil Memon, Carmelo Munzone, Jason Owen
- Girls: Bella Ferraro, Shiane Hawke, Bella Hunter, Morgan Sheather, Angel Tupai, Vendulka Wichta
- Over 25s: Danielle Blakey, Chris Cayzer, Samantha Jade, Justin Standley, Rob Vegas, Nathaniel Willemse
- Groups: Black Ivory, D&D, Fourtunate, Good Question, The Collective, What About Tonight

=== Judges' House ===
The final round of the selection process, the home visits, saw the top 24 acts travel to exclusive locations around the world to find out which judge would become their mentor. The Boys, Girls and Over 25s travelled to New York City, while the Groups visited London. Each judge reduced their six acts to three, with help from celebrity guest mentors. The Boys were assigned to Mel B and mentored by Usher, the Girls were assigned to Natalie Bassingthwaighte and mentored by Kesha, the Over 25s were assigned to Guy Sebastian and mentored by Alicia Keys, and the Groups were assigned to Ronan Keating and mentored by One Direction. During the first day of home visits, each act was given a private mentoring session with their mentor, ahead of their solo performance in front of their mentor and guest mentor the next day. After, the judges along with their guest mentors, narrowed down the contestants to three each.

Summary of judges' houses
Judge	Category	Location	Assistant	Contestants eliminated
Mel B	Boys	New York City	Usher	Matt Cenere, Matt Gresham, Carmelo Munzone
Bassingthwaighte	Girls	New York City	Kesha	Bella Hunter, Morgan Sheather, Vendulka Wichta
Sebastian	Over 25s	New York City	Alicia Keys	Danielle Blakey, Chris Cayzer, Rob Vegas
Keating	Groups	London	One Direction	Black Ivory, D&D, Good Question

== Acts ==
Key:

– Winner
– Runner-Up
– Ejected

Act	Age(s)	Hometown	Category (mentor)	Result
Samantha Jade	25	Perth, Western Australia	Over 25s (Sebastian)	Winner
Jason Owen	18	Dubbo, New South Wales	Boys (Mel B)	Runner-Up
The Collective	17–22	Various	Groups (Keating)	3rd Place
Bella Ferraro	18	Sydney, New South Wales	Girls (Bassingthwaighte)	4th Place
Shiane Hawke	14	Darwin, Northern Territory	Girls (Bassingthwaighte)	5th Place
Nathaniel Willemse	27	South Africa/Melbourne	Over 25s (Sebastian)	6th Place
Fourtunate	17–20	Sydney, New South Wales	Groups (Keating)	7th Place
Angel Tupai	19	Parramatta, New South Wales	Girls (Bassingthwaighte)	8th Place
Carmelo Munzone	23	Sydney, New South Wales	Boys (Mel B)	9th Place
Justin Standley	41	Bundaberg	Over 25s (Sebastian)	10th Place
What About Tonight	15–19	Various	Groups (Keating)	11th Place
Josh Brookes	20	Perth, Western Australia	Boys (Mel B)	12th Place
Adil Memon	18	Ipswich, Queensland	Boys (Mel B)	13th Place

== Live shows ==
=== Results summary ===
Colour key

Act in Boys
Act in Girls
Act in Over 25s
Act in Groups

– Act in the bottom two and had to perform again in the final showdown
– Act received the fewest public votes and was immediately eliminated (no final showdown)
– Act was ejected from the competition without singing or facing the public vote

Weekly results per act
Act	Week 1	Week 2	Week 3	Week 4	Week 5	Week 6	Week 7	Quarter-Final	Semi-Final	Final	
Act	Week 1	Week 2	Week 3	Week 4	Week 5	Week 6	Week 7	Quarter-Final	Semi-Final	Monday Vote	Tuesday Vote
Samantha Jade	Bottom Two	Safe	Safe	Safe	7th	Safe	5th	Safe	Safe	Safe	Winner
Jason Owen	Safe	Safe	Safe	Safe	Safe	Safe	Safe	Safe	Safe	Safe	Runner-Up
The Collective	Safe	Safe	Safe	Safe	Safe	Safe	Safe	Bottom Two	3rd	3rd	Eliminated (Final)
Bella Ferraro	Safe	Safe	Safe	Safe	Safe	Bottom Two	Safe	Safe	4th	Eliminated (Semi-Final)	
Shiane Hawke	Safe	Safe	Safe	Safe	Safe	Safe	Safe	Bottom Two	Eliminated (Quarter-Final)		
Nathaniel Willemse	Safe	10th	Safe	Safe	Safe	Safe	6th	Eliminated (Week 7)			
Fourtunate	Safe	Safe	Safe	Bottom Two	Safe	Bottom Two	Eliminated (Week 6)				
Angel Tupai	Safe	Safe	Bottom Two	Safe	8th	Eliminated (Week 5)					
Carmelo Munzone	Eliminated (Home Visits)^{1}	Safe	Safe	Bottom Two	Eliminated (Week 4)						
Justin Standley	Safe	Safe	Bottom Two	Eliminated (Week 3)							
What About Tonight	Safe	11th	Eliminated (Week 2)								
Josh Brookes	Safe	Ejected (Week 2)									
Adil Memon	Bottom Two	Eliminated (Week 1)									
Final Showdown	Adil, Jade	What About Tonight, Willemse	Standley, Tupai	Munzone, Fortunate	Tupai, Jade	Fourtunate, Ferraro	Jade, Willemse	The Collective, Hawke	Ferraro, The Collective	No bottom two/judges' vote; public votes alone decide who wins	
Judges voted to	Eliminate								Send Through	No bottom two/judges' vote; public votes alone decide who wins	
Keating's vote (Groups)	Memon	Willemse	Standley	Munzone	Tupai	Ferraro	Willemse	Hawke	The Collective	No bottom two/judges' vote; public votes alone decide who wins	
Bassingthwaighte's vote (Girls)	Memon	What About Tonight	Standley	Munzone	Jade	Fourtunate	Jade	The Collective	Ferraro	No bottom two/judges' vote; public votes alone decide who wins	
Sebastian's vote (Over 25s)	Memon	What About Tonight^{2}	Tupai	Munzone	Tupai	Fourtunate	Willemse	Hawke	The Collective	No bottom two/judges' vote; public votes alone decide who wins	
Mel B's vote (Boys)	Jade	Willemse	Standley	Fourtunate	Jade	Fourtunate	Jade	Hawke	Ferraro	No bottom two/judges' vote; public votes alone decide who wins	
Eliminated	Adil Memon; 3 of 4 votes Majority	What About Tonight; 2 of 4 votes Deadlock	Justin Standley; 3 of 4 votes Majority	Carmelo Munzone; 3 of 4 votes Majority	Angel Tupai; 2 of 4 votes Deadlock	Fourtunate; 3 of 4 votes Majority	Nathaniel Willemse; 2 of 4 votes Deadlock	Shiane Hawke; 3 of 4 votes Majority	Bella Ferraro; 2 of 4 votes Deadlock	The Collective; Public Vote To Save	Jason Owen; Public Vote To Win

Notes

- ^1– Josh Brookes was ejected from the show due to rule violations. Carmelo Munzone replaced him on the second live show.
- ^2– Sebastian was not present for this results show. As one of his acts (Nathaniel Willemse) was in the bottom two, a vote against What About Tonight was cast on Sebastian's behalf on the typical assumption that Sebastian would have voted against What About Tonight.

=== Live show details ===
==== Week 1 (17/18 September) ====
- Theme: Judges' Choice
- Celebrity performers: Ronan Keating ("Fires") and Guy Sebastian featuring Lupe Fiasco ("Battle Scars")
- Group performance: "Call Me Maybe"

Acts' performances on the first live show
Act	Category (mentor)	Order	Song	Result
What About Tonight	Groups (Keating)	1	"Glad You Came"	Safe
Josh Brookes	Boys (Mel B)	2	"Don't Wanna Go Home"	Safe
Angel Tupai	Girls (Bassingthwaighte)	3	"Happy"	Safe
Justin Standley	Over 25s (Sebastian)	4	"Father and Son"	Safe
Fourtunate	Groups (Keating)	5	"Payphone"	Safe
Jason Owen	Boys (Mel B)	6	"Heaven"	Safe
Samantha Jade	Over 25s (Sebastian)	7	"Wide Awake"	Bottom Two
Adil Memon	Boys (Mel B)	8	"Fast Car"	Bottom Two
The Collective	Groups (Keating)	9	"Domino"	Safe
Bella Ferraro	Girls (Bassingthwaighte)	10	"Brother"	Safe
Nathaniel Willemse	Over 25s (Sebastian)	11	"Love on Top"	Safe
Shiane Hawke	Girls (Bassingthwaighte)	12	"Crazy"	Safe
Final showdown details
Act	Category (mentor)	Order	Song	Result
Adil Memon	Boys (Mel B)	1	"Just the Way You Are"	Eliminated
Samantha Jade	Over 25s (Sebastian)	2	"Without You"	Safe

Judges' vote to eliminate

- Sebastian: Adil Memon – backed his own act, Samantha Jade.
- Mel B: Samantha Jade – backed her own act, Adil Memon.
- Bassingthwaighte: Adil Memon – stated that Jade had improved more.
- Keating: Adil Memon – based on the final showdown performance.

Notes

- The Collective's performance of "Domino" debuted on the ARIA Singles Chart at number 35 on 24 September 2012.

==== Week 2 (25/26 September) ====
- Theme: Party All Night
- Celebrity performers: James Morrison ("I Won't Let You Go") and The Script ("Hall of Fame")
- Group performance: "R.I.P."/"How We Do (Party)" with Rita Ora

Acts' performances on the second live show
Act	Category (mentor)	Order	Song	Result
Angel Tupai	Girls (Bassingthwaighte)	1	"Young Hearts Run Free"	Safe
Jason Owen	Boys (Mel B)	2	"Dancing in the Moonlight"	Safe
Fourtunate	Groups (Keating)	3	"Blame It on the Boogie"	Safe
Nathaniel Willemse	Over 25s (Sebastian)	4	"Canned Heat"	Bottom Two
Bella Ferraro	Girls (Bassingthwaighte)	5	"What Makes You Beautiful"	Safe
What About Tonight	Groups (Keating)	6	"Year 3000"	Bottom Two
Justin Standley	Over 25s (Sebastian)	7	"Bohemian Rhapsody"	Safe
Carmelo Munzone	Boys (Mel B)	8	"Everlasting Love"	Safe
Samantha Jade	Over 25s (Sebastian)	9	"Freefallin"	Safe
Shiane Hawke	Girls (Bassingthwaighte)	10	"I Heard It Through the Grapevine"	Safe
The Collective	Groups (Keating)	11	"Footloose"	Safe
Final showdown details
Act	Category (mentor)	Order	Song	Result
What About Tonight	Groups (Keating)	1	"The Way You Make Me Feel"	Eliminated
Nathaniel Willemse	Over 25s (Sebastian)	2	"It Will Rain"	Safe

Judges' vote to eliminate

- Sebastian: What About Tonight – despite his absence in the results show, an automatic vote was cast to save Nathaniel Willemse based on the usual assumption that he would have voted to save his own act.
- Keating: Nathaniel Willemse – backed his own act, What About Tonight.
- Bassingthwaighte: What About Tonight – stated she was not voting strategically.
- Mel B: Nathaniel Williemse – could not decide and sent the result to deadlock.

With the acts in the bottom two receiving two votes each, the result went to deadlock and reverted to the earlier public vote. What About Tonight were eliminated as the act with the fewest public votes.

Notes

- This week's live shows aired on Tuesday and Wednesday nights due to the Seven Network's coverage of the 2012 Brownlow Medal.
- Sebastian was absent from the results show due to him traveling to New York to perform "Battle Scars" on the Late Show with David Letterman.
- On 30 September 2012, the performances of three finalists entered the ARIA Singles Chart. The Collective's performance of "Footloose" debuted at number 41, Bella Ferraro's performance of "What Makes You Beautiful" debuted at number 62, and What About Tonight's performance of "Year 3000" debuted at number 97.
- Josh Brookes was disqualified from the show and was replaced by Carmelo Munzone.

==== Week 3 (1/2 October) ====
- Theme: Top 10 Hits
- Celebrity performers: Lady Antebellum ("Need You Now") and Pink ("Try")
- Group performance: "Lolita"/"Untouched"/"4ever" with The Veronicas

Acts' performances on the third live show
Act	Category (mentor)	Order	Song	Result
Justin Standley	Over 25s (Sebastian)	1	"Some Nights"	Bottom Two
The Collective	Groups (Keating)	2	"You Got It (The Right Stuff)"/"Billie Jean"	Safe
Angel Tupai	Girls (Bassingthwaighte)	3	"Next to Me"	Bottom Two
Carmelo Munzone	Boys (Mel B)	4	"Whataya Want from Me"	Safe
Samantha Jade	Over 25s (Sebastian)	5	"Everytime"	Safe
Bella Ferraro	Girls (Bassingthwaighte)	6	"Big Yellow Taxi"	Safe
Jason Owen	Boys (Mel B)	7	"I Don't Want to Miss a Thing"	Safe
Nathaniel Willemse	Over 25s (Sebastian)	8	"Try a Little Tenderness"	Safe
Shiane Hawke	Girls (Bassingthwaighte)	9	"Beautiful"	Safe
Fourtunate	Groups (Keating)	10	"Dedication to My Ex (Miss That)"	Safe
Final showdown details
Act	Category (mentor)	Order	Song	Result
Justin Standley	Over 25s (Sebastian)	1	"The Reason"	Eliminated
Angel Tupai	Girls (Bassingthwaighte)	2	"Open Arms"	Safe

Judges' vote to eliminate

- Bassingthwaighte: Justin Standley – backed her own act, Angel Tupai.
- Mel B: Justin Standley – stated that Tupai could go further in the competition.
- Sebastian: Angel Tupai – backed his own act, Justin Standley.
- Keating: Justin Standley – stated that Tupai was his biggest threat in the competition but chose not to vote strategically.

Notes

- On 7 October 2012, the performances of two finalists entered the ARIA Singles Chart. The Collective's performance of "You Got It (The Right Stuff)" debuted at number 78, and Bella Ferraro's performance of "Big Yellow Taxi" debuted at number 84.
- When Justin Standley was announced in the bottom two, he became the third Over 25 to land in the bottom two in three consecutive weeks, as the other two acts from that category already fell in the bottom two in their respective weeks (Samantha Jade in Week 1 and Nathaniel Willemse in Week 2).

==== Week 4 (8/9 October) ====
- Theme: Legends
- Celebrity performers: Labrinth ("Earthquake") and Birdy ("Skinny Love")
- Group performance: "I Can't Help Myself (Sugar Pie Honey Bunch)"/"What a Man"/"Land of a Thousand Dances" with Jessica Mauboy

Acts' performances on the fourth live show
Act	Category (mentor)	Order	Song	Legend	Result
Fourtunate	Groups (Keating)	1	"Easy Lover"	Phil Collins	Bottom Two
Carmelo Munzone	Boys (Mel B)	2	"Every Little Thing She Does Is Magic"	The Police	Bottom Two
Shiane Hawke	Girls (Bassingthwaighte)	3	"Piece of My Heart"	Erma Franklin	Safe
Samantha Jade	Over 25s (Sebastian)	4	"Run to You"	Whitney Houston	Safe
Jason Owen	Boys (Mel B)	5	"Dancing in the Dark"	Bruce Springsteen	Safe
The Collective	Groups (Keating)	6	"A Hard Day's Night"	The Beatles	Safe
Bella Ferraro	Girls (Bassingthwaighte)	7	"Ray of Light"	Madonna	Safe
Nathaniel Willemse	Over 25s (Sebastian)	8	"The Scientist"	Coldplay	Safe
Angel Tupai	Girls (Bassingthwaighte)	9	"Dirty Diana"	Michael Jackson	Safe
Final showdown details
Act	Category (mentor)	Order	Song		Result
Carmelo Munzone	Boys (Mel B)	1	"Feeling Good"		Eliminated
Fourtunate	Groups (Keating)	2	"Without You"		Safe

Judges' vote to eliminate

- Keating: Carmelo Munzone – backed his own act, Fourtunate.
- Bassingthwaighte: Carmelo Munzone – stated Fourtunate could improve more.
- Mel B: Fourtunate – backed her own act, Carmelo Munzone.
- Sebastian: Carmelo Munzone – based his decision on who he felt needed more work.

Notes

- Nathaniel Willemse's performance of "The Scientist" debuted on the ARIA Singles Chart at number 75 on 14 October 2012.

==== Week 5 (15/16 October) ====
- Theme: Songs from the 1980s
- Celebrity performers: Reece Mastin ("Rock Star") and Psy ("Gangnam Style")
- Group performance: "Do You Remember"/"So High"/"Down" with Jay Sean

Acts' performances on the fifth live show
Act	Category (mentor)	Order	Song	Result
Jason Owen	Boys (Mel B)	1	"I'm Still Standing"	Safe
Angel Tupai	Girls (Bassingthwaighte)	2	"I Want to Know What Love Is"	Bottom Two
Nathaniel Willemse	Over 25s (Sebastian)	3	"What's Love Got to Do with It"	Safe
Fourtunate	Groups (Keating)	4	"How Will I Know"	Safe
Bella Ferraro	Girls (Bassingthwaighte)	5	"99 Red Balloons"	Safe
Samantha Jade	Over 25s (Sebastian)	6	"You Can't Hurry Love"	Bottom Two
Shiane Hawke	Girls (Bassingthwaighte)	7	"True Colors"	Safe
The Collective	Groups (Keating)	8	"Like a Prayer"	Safe
Final showdown details
Act	Category (mentor)	Order	Song	Result
Angel Tupai	Girls (Bassingthwaighte)	1	"Family Portrait"	Eliminated
Samantha Jade	Over 25s (Sebastian)	2	"I Will Be"	Safe

Judges' vote to eliminate

- Sebastian: Angel Tupai – backed his own act, Samantha Jade.
- Bassingthwaighte: Samantha Jade – backed her own act, Angel Tupai.
- Keating: Angel Tupai – based on the final showdown performance.
- Mel B: Samantha Jade – based on the performances throughout the competition.

With the acts in the bottom two receiving two votes each, the result went to deadlock and reverted to the earlier public vote. Angel Tupai was eliminated as the act with the fewest public votes.

Notes

- On Monday night, viewers were able to vote for the judge they would have liked to see perform the "Gangnam Style" dance routine on Tuesday night. Mel B won the vote, therefore she joined Psy to perform the "Gangnam Style" routine.
- The Collective's performance of "Like a Prayer" debuted on the ARIA Singles Chart at number 65 on 21 October 2012.

==== Week 6 (22/23 October) ====
- Theme: Latest and Greatest
- Celebrity performers: Cher Lloyd ("Want U Back") and Matchbox Twenty ("She's So Mean")
- Group performance: "Part of Me"

Acts' performances on the sixth live show
Act	Category (mentor)	Order	Song	Result
Fourtunate	Groups (Keating)	1	"You Make Me Feel..."	Bottom Two
Jason Owen	Boys (Mel B)	2	"You Belong with Me"	Safe
Shiane Hawke	Girls (Bassingthwaighte)	3	"Hometown Glory"	Safe
Nathaniel Willemse	Over 25s (Sebastian)	4	"Let Me Love You (Until You Learn to Love Yourself)"	Safe
The Collective	Groups (Keating)	5	"Lego House"	Safe
Bella Ferraro	Girls (Bassingthwaighte)	6	"Shake It Out"	Bottom Two
Samantha Jade	Over 25s (Sebastian)	7	"Scream"	Safe
Final showdown details
Act	Category (mentor)	Order	Song	Result
Fourtunate	Groups (Keating)	1	"Man in the Mirror"	Eliminated
Bella Ferraro	Girls (Bassingthwaighte)	2	"Tonight"	Safe

Judges' vote to eliminate

- Sebastian: Fourtunate – said that Ferraro had more potential and wanted to see her improve.
- Bassingthwaighte: Fourtunate – backed her own act, Bella Ferraro.
- Keating: Bella Ferraro – backed his own act, Fourtunate.
- Mel B: Fourtunate – said Ferraro had more potential and wanted to see her journey throughout the competition.

Notes

- The Collective's performance of "Lego House" debuted on the ARIA Singles Chart at number 70 on 28 October 2012.

==== Week 7 (29/30 October) ====
- Theme: Made in Australia
- Celebrity performers: Little Mix ("Wings") and Ellie Goulding ("Anything Could Happen")
- Group performance: "Touch" with Silver Sneakerz

Acts' performances on the seventh live show
Act	Category (mentor)	Order	Song	Australian artist	Result
Samantha Jade	Over 25s (Sebastian)	1	"UFO"	Sneaky Sound System	Bottom Two
Shiane Hawke	Girls (Bassingthwaighte)	2	"Shine"	Vanessa Amorosi	Safe
The Collective	Groups (Keating)	3	"Incredible"	Timomatic	Safe
Nathaniel Willemse	Over 25s (Sebastian)	4	"Red"	Daniel Merriweather	Bottom Two
Bella Ferraro	Girls (Bassingthwaighte)	5	"Sweet Disposition"	The Temper Trap	Safe
Jason Owen	Boys (Mel B)	6	"What's My Scene?"	Hoodoo Gurus	Safe
Final showdown details
Act	Category (mentor)	Order	Song		Result
Samantha Jade	Over 25s (Sebastian)	1	"At Last"		Safe
Nathaniel Willemse	Over 25s (Sebastian)	2	"Sexual Healing"		Eliminated

Judges' vote to eliminate

- Bassingthwaighte: Samantha Jade – stated that Willemse can improve more.
- Keating: Nathaniel Willemse – based on the final showdown performance.
- Mel B: Samantha Jade – based on the final showdown performance; though stated that she was not impressed with either performance.
- Sebastian: Nathaniel Willemse – could not send either of his own acts home and sent the result to deadlock.

With the acts in the bottom two receiving two votes each, the result went to deadlock and reverted to the earlier public vote. Nathaniel Willemse was eliminated as the act with the fewest public votes.

Notes

- On 4 November 2012, the performances of two finalists entered the ARIA Singles Chart. Bella Ferraro's performance of "Sweet Disposition" debuted at number 59, and Nathaniel Willemse's performance of "Red" debuted at number 91.

==== Week 8: Quarter-Final (5/6 November) ====
- Theme: Judges' Challenge
- Celebrity performers: Johnny Ruffo ("Take It Home") and Kesha ("Die Young")
- Group performance: "Turn Up the Love"

Acts' performances in the quarter-final
Act	Category (mentor)	Order	Song	Chosen by	Result
Shiane Hawke	Girls (Bassingthwaighte)	1	"A Thousand Years"	Guy Sebastian	Bottom Two
The Collective	Groups (Keating)	2	"Beauty and a Beat"	Mel B	Bottom Two
Samantha Jade	Over 25s (Sebastian)	3	"Stronger (What Doesn't Kill You)"	Natalie Bassingthwaighte	Safe
Jason Owen	Boys (Mel B)	4	"If Tomorrow Never Comes"	Ronan Keating	Safe
Bella Ferraro	Girls (Bassingthwaighte)	5	"Dreams"	Mel B	Safe
Final showdown details
Act	Category (mentor)	Order	Song		Result
The Collective	Groups (Keating)	1	"As Long as You Love Me"		Safe
Shiane Hawke	Girls (Bassingthwaighte)	2	"Wherever You Will Go"		Eliminated

Judges' vote to eliminate

- Bassingthwaighte: The Collective – backed her own act, Shiane Hawke.
- Keating: Shiane Hawke – backed his own act, The Collective.
- Mel B: Shiane Hawke – stated that she wanted The Collective to improve.
- Sebastian: Shiane Hawke – stated that although Hawke had potential as an artist, The Collective could go further in the competition.

Notes

- On 11 November 2012, the performances of two finalists entered the ARIA Singles Chart. Bella Ferraro's performance of "Dreams" debuted at number 82, and The Collective's performance of "Beauty and a Beat" debuted at number 94. Samantha Jade's performance of "Stronger (What Doesn't Kill You)" debuted at number 96 on 18 November 2012.

==== Week 9: Semi-Final (12/13 November) ====
- Theme: Power and Passion
- Celebrity performers: Sam and the Womp ("Bom Bom") and Elton John vs. Pnau ("Sad" and "Good Morning to the Night")

Acts' performances in the semi-final
Act	Category (mentor)	Order	First song	Order	Second song	Result
Jason Owen	Boys (Mel B)	1	"Life Is a Highway"	5	"How Do I Live"	Safe
Samantha Jade	Over 25s (Sebastian)	2	"Heartless"	6	"Where Have You Been"	Safe
Bella Ferraro	Girls (Bassingthwaighte)	3	"Bulletproof"	7	"The Last Day on Earth"	Bottom Two
The Collective	Groups (Keating)	4	"Apologize"	8	"Yeah 3x"	Bottom Two
Final showdown details
Bella Ferraro	Girls (Bassingthwaighte)	1	"Angel"			Eliminated
The Collective	Groups (Keating)	2	"Use Somebody"			Safe

Judges' votes to send through to the grand final

- Keating: The Collective – backed his own act, The Collective.
- Bassingthwaighte: Bella Ferraro – backed her own act, Bella Ferraro.
- Mel B: Bella Ferraro – stated that Ferraro had improved more.
- Sebastian: The Collective – could not decide and sent the result to deadlock.

With the acts in the bottom two receiving two votes each, the result went to deadlock and reverted to the earlier public vote. The Collective advanced to the final as the act with the most public votes.

Notes

- For the first time this season, each act performed two songs.
- Also for the first time, the judges chose which act in the bottom two they wanted to see progress to the grand final.
- On 18 November 2012, the performances of three finalists entered the ARIA Singles Chart. Samantha Jade's performances of "Heartless" and "Where Have You Been" debuted at numbers 12 and 51, respectively. The Collective's performance of "Apologize" debuted at number 47 and their performance of "Yeah 3x" debuted at number 72. Bella Ferraro's performance of "The Last Day On Earth" debuted at number 90.

==== Week 10: Final (19/20 November) ====
19 November

- Celebrity performer: Guy Sebastian ("Get Along")
- Group performance: "On the Floor" (performed by all contestants except Josh Brooks and Adil Memon)

Acts' performances on the Monday Final
Act	Category (mentor)	Order	Audition song	Order	Winner's single	Order	Last shot song	Result
The Collective	Groups (Keating)	1	"We Found Love"	4	"Surrender"	7	"Brokenhearted"	Eliminated
Jason Owen	Boys (Mel B)	2	"Annie's Song"	5	"Make It Last"	8	"Lonely Boy"	Safe
Samantha Jade	Over 25s (Sebastian)	3	"Breakeven"	6	"What You've Done to Me"	9	"Take a Bow"	Safe

The Collective received the fewest public votes and were automatically eliminated.

20 November

- Celebrity performers: One Direction ("Little Things")
- Group performances:
  - "I Can Only Imagine" (performed by top 3 contestants)
  - "Good Time" with Owl City (performed with the contestants except Josh Brooks and Adil Memon)
  - "End of the Road" with Boyz II Men (performed with top three finalists)

Acts' performances on the Tuesday Final
Act	Category (mentor)	Order	Song of the series	Result
Samantha Jade	Over 25s (Sebastian)	1	"Scream"	Winner
Jason Owen	Boys (Mel B)	2	"Dancing in the Dark"	Runner-Up

Notes

- For the first time this season there was no theme.

== Charity single ==
The finalists recorded a cover of Carly Rae Jepsen's "Call Me Maybe" as a charity single in aid of Sony Foundation's You Can program which aims "to build specialised and age-appropriate youth cancer centres across Australia." The single was made available for download via the iTunes Store on 18 September 2012, after all twelve finalists performed the song on the first live results show that same day. It is the first time on X Factor Australia that finalists have released a charity single.

== Winner's single ==
On 16 November 2012, the Herald Sun reported that the winner's singles for the top three finalists, Samantha Jade, The Collective and Jason Owen, were written by Australian songwriting and production duo DNA Songs. Jade's single was "What You've Done to Me", The Collective's single was "Surrender", and Owen's single was "Make It Last". Each finalist performed their song during the grand final performance show on 19 November. After Jade was announced as the winner, "What You've Done to Me" was released. It entered the ARIA Singles Chart at number one on 26 November. Two days after The X Factor ended, it was announced that The Collective and Owen both signed recording contracts with Sony Music Australia and would release "Surrender" and "Make It Last" as their debut singles.

== The X Factor: One Direction to Superstardom ==
The X Factor: One Direction to Superstardom was a television special that aired on the Seven Network on 27 September 2012. The special followed the rise of One Direction, from their journey during the seventh series of The X Factor UK to becoming global superstars of today. It also featured One Direction's interview with X Factor Australia host Luke Jacobz. Aside from One Direction, the special included success stories of X Factor UK series three winner Leona Lewis, X Factor Australia season three winner Reece Mastin and finalist Johnny Ruffo, as well as the judges' opinions about the show and its "capacity to create global singing sensations." One Direction to Superstardom was watched by 691,000 viewers and was ranked fifteenth overall for the night.

== Reception ==
=== Contestants ===
On 20 September 2012, the Seven Network issued a statement saying that contestant Josh Brookes was disqualified from The X Factor because he "behaved in an inappropriate manner" on social media. A Twitcam video that was later uploaded to YouTube displays Brookes and contestant Adil Memon asking teenage girls for "sneaky banana pics", a phrase used by teenagers that means naked images. The Seven Network stated, "After a careful review of the incident, FremantleMedia Australia, producers of the program, together with Channel Seven, made a joint decision to remove him from the competition". During the second live performance show on 25 September, Mel B announced that Carmelo Munzone, who was eliminated during the "home visits" stage, was Brookes' replacement in the show.

=== Ratings ===
The premiere episode of The X Factor, which was broadcast on 20 August 2012, topped the night's overall ratings with 1,598,000 viewers. The next five episodes of auditions also ranked first on their respective nights. The first live performance show on 17 September 2012 gained 1,588,000 viewers and topped the night's overall ratings. The announcement of the winner during the grand final decider show on 20 November 2012 was watched by 1,921,000 viewers, making it the highest rated episode of the fourth season.

Colour key:
– Highest rating during the season
– Lowest rating during the season

Episode		Original airdate	Timeslot	Viewers (millions)	Nightly rank	Ref.
1	Auditions	20 August 2012	Monday 7:30 pm–9:00 pm	1.598	#1	
2	Auditions	21 August 2012	Tuesday 7:30 pm–8:30 pm	1.526	#1	
3	Auditions	22 August 2012	Wednesday 7:30 pm–8:30 pm	1.478	#1	
4	Auditions	27 August 2012	Monday 7:30 pm–8:30 pm	1.385	#1	
5	Auditions	28 August 2012	Tuesday 7:30 pm–8:30 pm	1.578	#1	
6	Auditions	29 August 2012	Wednesday 7:30 pm–8:30 pm	1.435	#1	
7	Super Bootcamp	3 September 2012	Monday 7:30 pm–8:30 pm	1.469	#1	
8	Super Bootcamp	4 September 2012	Tuesday 7:30 pm–8:30 pm	1.573	#1	
9	Super Bootcamp	5 September 2012	Wednesday 7:30 pm–8:30 pm	1.542	#1	
10	Home Visits	10 September 2012	Monday 7:30 pm–8:30 pm	1.384	#1	
11	Home Visits	11 September 2012	Tuesday 7:30 pm–8:30 pm	1.662	#1	
12	Home Visits	12 September 2012	Wednesday 7:30 pm–8:30 pm	1.502	#1	
13	Live show 1	17 September 2012	Monday 7:30 pm–9:30 pm	1.588	#1	
14	Live decider 1	18 September 2012	Tuesday 7:30 pm–8:30 pm	1.562	#1	
15	Live show 2	25 September 2012	Tuesday 7:30 pm–9:30 pm	1.643	#1	
16	Live decider 2	26 September 2012	Wednesday 7:30 pm–8:30 pm	1.415	#1	
17	One Direction to Superstardom	27 September 2012	Thursday 7:30 pm–8:30 pm	0.691	#15	
18	Live show 3	1 October 2012	Monday 7:30 pm–9:30 pm	1.432	#1	
19	Live decider 3	2 October 2012	Tuesday 7:30 pm–8:30 pm	1.471	#1	
20	Live show 4	8 October 2012	Monday 7:30 pm–9:30 pm	1.422	#1	
21	Live decider 4	9 October 2012	Tuesday 7:30 pm–8:30 pm	1.488	#1	
22	Live show 5	15 October 2012	Monday 7:30 pm–9:00 pm	1.485	#1	
23	Live decider 5	16 October 2012	Tuesday 7:30 pm–8:30 pm	1.665	#1	
24	Live show 6	22 October 2012	Monday 7:30 pm–9:00 pm	1.462	#1	
25	Live decider 6	23 October 2012	Tuesday 7:30 pm–8:30 pm	1.441	#1	
26	Live show 7	29 October 2012	Monday 7:30 pm–9:00 pm	1.417	#1	
27	Live decider 7	30 October 2012	Tuesday 7:30 pm–8:30 pm	1.430	#1	
28	Live show 8	5 November 2012	Monday 7:30 pm–8:30 pm	1.301	#1	
29	Live decider 8	6 November 2012	Tuesday 7:30 pm–8:30 pm	1.537	#4	
30	Live show 9	12 November 2012	Monday 7:30 pm–9:00 pm	1.536	#1	
31	Live decider 9	13 November 2012	Tuesday 7:30 pm–8:45 pm	1.498	#1	
32	Live Grand Final show	19 November 2012	Monday 7:30 pm–9:30 pm	1.667	#1	
33	Live Grand Final decider	20 November 2012	Tuesday 7:30 pm–9:30 pm	1.881	#2	
33	Winner Announced	20 November 2012	Tuesday 7:30 pm–9:30 pm	1.921	#1	
