= Swim (Chase Atlantic song) =

2017 song by Chase Atlantic

Song by Chase Atlantic

from the album Chase Atlantic
- Length: 3:48
- Label: Warner Bros.
- Songwriters: Christian Anthony; Clinton Cave; Mitchel Cave; Swish
- Producers: Christian Anthony; Clinton Cave; Mitchel Cave; DJ Swish

"Swim" is a song by Australian alternative R&B band Chase Atlantic. It was released on 4 October 2017 as part of the group's self-titled debut album, through Warner Bros. Records.

== Background and promotion ==
After signing to Warner Bros. Records in 2017, they released a series of EPs–Part One, Part Two, and Part Three–which helped the band amass a following of 900,000 monthly listeners. On 4 October 2017, they released the album, which had been in the works for three years. They released their music video for the song on 22 February 2018.

== Chart performance ==
"Swim" chart performance
Chart	Peak position
Germany (GfK)	92
Philippines Hot 100 (Billboard Philippines)	60
Global 200 (Billboard)	118

== Certifications ==
"Swim" certifications
Association	Certification	Reference
British Phonographic Industry	Platinum	
Music Canada	2× Platinum	
Recording Industry Association of America	Platinum	
Recorded Music NZ	2× Platinum	
SNEP	Platinum	
