= Beauty in Death =

- Standard cover

Studio album by Chase Atlantic
- Released: March 5, 2021
- Genres: Trap; R&B; Neo-psychedelia
- Length: 43:00
- Label: Fearless
- Producers: Chase Atlantic; Hoskins

Chase Atlantic chronology
Phases (2019)	Beauty in Death (2021)	Lost in Heaven (2024)

Singles from Beauty in Death
- 1. "Out the Roof" Released: August 14, 2020; 2. "Molly" Released: October 8, 2020; 3. "Slide" Released: January 29, 2021; 4. "Empty" Released: February 19, 2021

Alternative cover
- Deluxe Edition cover

Beauty in Death (styled in all caps) is the third studio album by Australian R&B band Chase Atlantic. It was released on March 5, 2021, through Fearless Records.

== Background and promotion ==
I guess even in the title, Beauty In Death, [writing the album] was a year when we all were faced with the possibility of mortality, that it can all be taken away really quickly,

— Clinton Cave

The group started recording their album in 2020 following the COVID-19 pandemic and to ease their collective unease. Before their album release, they released four singles: "Out the Roof", "Molly", "Slide", and "Empty". In August 2020, they signed to Fearless Records, becoming the second artist to do so. On 30 January 2021, the group announced their album, Beauty in Death, to be released on March 5.

On June 23, 2021, they announced a North American headline tour, marking the first tour in support of the album. On May 3, 2022, the group released the deluxe version of the album. Prior to the release, they released a string of singles: "Ohmami", "Ohmami" remix with Maggie Lindemann, and "Escort".

== Critical reception ==
The album was praised for mixing trap, R&B, and psychedelic alternative, along with its heartfelt vocals and effortless switches between dark and light sounds. James Shotwell of Substeam Magazine described the album as a whirlwind of hypnotic sounds and heartbreaking poetry,

== Track listing ==
Beauty in Death track listing
No.	Title	Writer(s)	Producer	Length
1.	"Paranoid"	Clinton Cave; Mitchel Cave; Christian Anthony	Chase Atlantic	3:40
2.	"Pleasexanny"	C. Cave; M. Cave; Anthony; Patrick Wilde	Chase Atlantic	3:17
3.	"Out the Roof"	C. Cave; M. Cave; Anthony	Chase Atlantic	3:15
4.	"Slide"	C. Cave; M. Cave; Anthony	Chase Atlantic	3:55
5.	"Beauty in Death"	C. Cave; M. Cave; Anthony; Wilde	Chase Atlantic	4:24
6.	"Please Stand By" (featuring De'Wayne and Xavier Mayne)	C. Cave; M. Cave; Anthony; De'Wayne Jackson; Sony Sando	Chase Atlantic	3:25
7.	"Aleyuh"	C. Cave; M. Cave; Anthony	Chase Atlantic	3:11
8.	"Molly"	C. Cave; M. Cave; Anthony	Chase Atlantic	3:28
9.	"Call Me Back"	C. Cave; M. Cave; Anthony; Wilde	Chase Atlantic	4:05
10.	"I Think I'm Lost Again"	C. Cave; M. Cave; Anthony	Chase Atlantic	3:31
11.	"Empty"	C. Cave; M. Cave; Anthony	Chase Atlantic	3:50
12.	"Wasted"	C. Cave; M. Cave; Anthony	Chase Atlantic	2:55
Total length:				43:00

Beauty in Death (Deluxe Edition) track listing
No.	Title	Writer(s)	Producer(s)	Length
13.	"Stranger Things"	C. Cave; M. Cave; Anthony	Chase Atlantic	2:48
14.	"Ohmami"	C. Cave; M. Cave; Anthony	Chase Atlantic	3:46
15.	"Chxse"	C. Cave; M. Cave; Anthony	Chase Atlantic	3:29
16.	"Escort"	C. Cave; M. Cave; Anthony; Cam Bloomfield; Jonathan Hoskins	Chase Atlantic; Hoskins	3:38
17.	"Cold Nights"	C. Cave; M. Cave; Anthony	Chase Atlantic	3:11
18.	"Ohmami" (with Maggie Lindemann)	C. Cave; M. Cave; Anthony; Maggie Lindemann; Paris Carney	Chase Atlantic	3:46
Total length:				1:03:00

== Chart performance ==
Chart	Peak position
Scottish Albums (Official Charts)	60
