= Phases (Chase Atlantic album) =

Studio album by Chase Atlantic
- Released: June 28, 2019
- Recorded: January–April 2019
- Length: 41:07
- Label: MDDN
- Producers: Christian Anthony; Mitchel Cave; Clinton Cave

Chase Atlantic chronology
Don't Try This (2019)	Phases (2019)	Beauty in Death (2020)

Singles from Phases
- 1. "Her" Released: 10 May 2019; 2. "StuckInMyBrain" Released: 24 May 2019; 3. "Love Is (Not) Easy" Released: 7 June 2019

Phases (styled in all caps) is the second studio album by Australian alternative R&B band Chase Atlantic. It was released on 28 June 2019 through MDDN.

== Background and promotion ==
In 2018, the band left their old record label, Warner Records, and went independent. Before that, they toured around the United States and released standalone singles "Numb to the Feeling" and "Tidal Wave". They spent January–April 2019 working on their album, before in April which they announced the release of their album on June 28, and announced their new Phases Tour: North America.

The rest of the album is like a journey, man. Like a journey to outer space going around the world and then coming back down.

— Mitchell Cave, lead singer of Chase Atlantic

They also released the singles, "Her", "StuckInMyBrain", and "Love Is (Not) Easy", on 10 May, 24 May, and 7 June 2019, respectively.

== Track listing ==
All tracks are written by Chase Atlantic.

Phases track listing
No.	Title	Length
1.	"Intro"	2:02
2.	"Angels"	4:18
3.	"Phases"	3:02
4.	"Love Is (Not) Easy"	3:08
5.	"Her"	2:49
6.	"No Rainbows"	3:34
7.	"Heaven and Back"	4:08
8.	"StuckInMyBrain"	3:49
9.	"Even Though I'm Depressed"	3:29
10.	"Too Late"	3:12
11.	"I Never Existed"	3:50
12.	"I Don't Like Darkness"	3:40
Total length:		41:07

== Chart performance ==
Chart (2019)	Peak position
US Independent Albums (Billboard)	24
US Heatseekers Chart (Billboard)	6
UK Independent Albums (Official Charts)	34
