= Jason Owen (singer) =

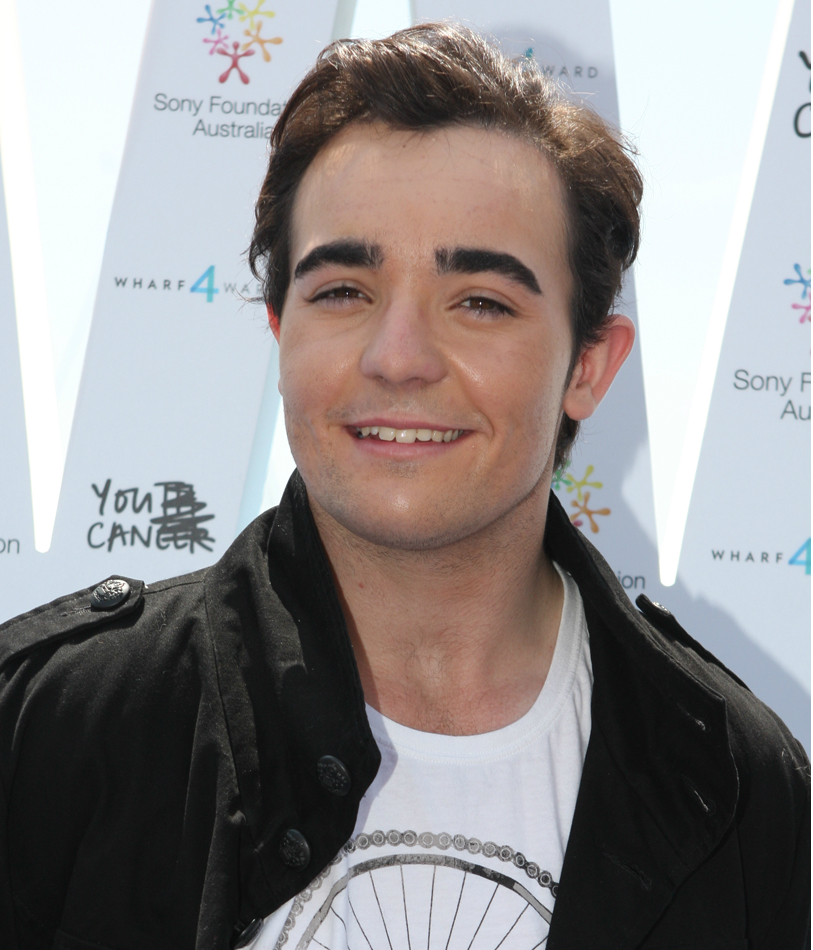
- in 2012

Background information
- Born: Dubbo, New South Wales, Australia
- Genres: Pop, country
- Occupations: Singer, songwriter
- Years active: 2012–present
- Labels: Sony Music Australia, Social Family
- Spouse: Becy Owen
- Website: jasonowenofficial.com

Jason Owen (born circa 1994) is an Australian singer from Dubbo, New South Wales and was the runner-up to Samantha Jade on the fourth season of The X Factor Australia in 2012 and subsequently received a recording contract with Sony Music Australia.

== Career ==
=== 2012–2013: The X Factor and Sony Music Australia ===
In 2012, Owen auditioned for season four of The X Factor Australia, eventually became the runner-up.

Show	Theme	Song choice	Original artist	Order	Result
Auditions	Free choice	"Annie's Song"	John Denver	N/A	Through to super bootcamp
Super bootcamp	Free choice	"N/A"	N/A	N/A	Through to home visits
Home Visits	Free choice	"N/A"	N/A	N/A	Through to live shows
Week 1	Judges' Choice	"Heaven"	Bryan Adams	6	Safe
Week 2	Party All Night	"Dancing in the Moonlight"	King Harvest	2	Safe
Week 3	Top 10 Hits	"I Don't Want to Miss a Thing"	Aerosmith	7	Safe
Week 4	Legends	"Dancing in the Dark"	Bruce Springsteen	5	Safe
Week 5	1980s	"I'm Still Standing"	Elton John	1	Safe
Week 6	Latest and Greatest	"You Belong With Me"	Taylor Swift	2	Safe
Week 7	Made in Australia	"What's My Scene?"	Hoodoo Gurus	6	Safe
Week 8	Judges' Challenge	"If Tomorrow Never Comes"	Ronan Keating	4	Safe
Semi-final	Power and Passion	"Life Is a Highway"	Tom Cochrane	1	Safe
Semi-final	Power and Passion	"How Do I Live"	LeAnn Rimes	5	Safe
Final	Audition song	"Annie's Song"	John Denver	2	Safe
Final	Last shot song	"Lonely Boy"	The Black Keys	8	Safe
Final	Song of the series	"Dancing in the Dark"	Bruce Springsteen	1	Safe
Final	Runner up's single	"Make It Last"	Owen	5	Runner up

Owen released his debut single "Make It Last", which would have been his winner's single if he had won The X Factor, on 23 November 2012. The single peaked at number 47 on the ARIA Singles Chart. Owen's debut studio album Life Is a Highway was released on 26 April 2013, and debuted at number five on the ARIA Albums Chart and was the thirtieth highest selling album by an Australian artist in 2013.

=== 2014–present: Proud and John Denver albums ===
Owen left Sony Music Australia and signed with Social Family Records in June 2014. His second album Friday Night was released on 6 March 2015, and debuted at number nine on the ARIA Albums Chart. It was the 53rd highest selling country album in Australia in 2015.

His third album Proud was released on 6 May 2016. It is his first album of original material.

Owen's fourth album Jason Owen Sings John Denver was released in 2017 to mark 20 years since Denver's passing.

In August 2018, Owen wrote and recorded the song "These Are the Times", with funds raised going towards drought relief.

== Discography ==
=== Albums ===
Title	Album details	Peak chart positions
Title	Album details	AUS
Life Is a Highway	Released: 23 April 2013; Label: Sony Music Australia; Format: CD, digital download	5
Friday Night	Released: 6 March 2015; Label: Jason Owen / Social Family; Format: CD, digital download	9
Proud	Released: 6 May 2016; Label: Social Family; Format: CD, digital download	—
Jason Owen Sings John Denver	Released: 30 June 2017; Label: Social Family; Format: CD, digital download	85
Jason Owen Sings John Denver: The Acoustic Sessions	Released: 14 May 2021; Label: Jason Owen, Checked; Format: Digital download, streaming	17

=== Singles ===
Title	Year	Peak chart positions	Album
Title	Year	AUS	Album
"Make It Last"	2012	46	Non-album single
"Damn Right"	2014	—	Friday Night
"Tears on Fire"	2015	—	Friday Night
"I Won't Back Down"	2015	—	Friday Night
"Run"	2016	—	Proud
"Proud"	2016	—	Proud
"My Last"	2016	—	Proud
"Take Me Home, Country Roads"	2017	—	Jason Owen Sings John Denver
"Calypso"	2017	—	Jason Owen Sings John Denver
"Apple Tree"	2018	—	Non-album single
"These Are the Times"	2018	—	Non-album single
"Better Than Than"	2018	—	Non-album single
"The Power of Love"	2019	—	Non-album single
"Undefeatable " (featuring Philly)	2019	—	Non-album single
"Before I Let You Go"	2020	—	Non-album single
"So This Is Christmas"	2020	—	Non-album single
"Thank God I'm a Country Boy"	2021	—	Jason Owen Sings John Denver: The Acoustic Sessions
"Back Home Again" (featuring Tania Kernaghan)	2021	—	Jason Owen Sings John Denver: The Acoustic Sessions
"Distracted"	2021	—	Non-album single
"Father and Son" (with James Blundell)	2021	—	Non-album single
"Sing Australia"	2022	—	Non-album single
"Let Love Flow" (with Tania Kernaghan)	2023	—	Non-album single
"—" denotes a single that failed to chart.

== Awards ==
- 2014 Nomination: CMAA 'Highest Selling Country Album of the Year'
