= Chase Atlantic (album) =

Studio album by Chase Atlantic
- Released: 4 October 2017
- Recorded: 2014–2017
- Genres: R&B; pop; alternative pop; hip hop; rock
- Length: 56:56
- Label: Warner Bros.
- Producers: Christian Anthony; Mitchel Cave; Clinton Cave

Chase Atlantic chronology
Part Three (EP) (2017)	Chase Atlantic (2017)	Don't Try This (2019)

Chase Atlantic is the self-titled debut studio album by Australian alternative R&B band Chase Atlantic. It was released on 4 October 2017 through Warner Bros. Records.

== Background and production ==
Following a series of EPs released between 2014 and 2017, Chase Atlantic signed with Warner Bros. Records in early 2017, with the album being recorded between the same years in studios located in Los Angeles and Cairns.

== Release and promotion ==
Chase Atlantic was released worldwide on 4 October 2017. The band premiered the single "Okay" on Zane Lowe's Beats 1 show, and conducted interviews with outlets including Strife Mag and GoldenPlec. They supported Sleeping with Sirens on the Gossip: Up Close & Personal Tour prior to the album's release and subsequently embarked on their own headlining tour in the U.S. in October 2017.

== Composition ==
The album's sound blends alternative R&B with elements of pop, hip-hop, and rock. Interviews around the release also noted "moody" programmed beats, "spacey" vocals, and the use of saxophone across the arrangements, alongside the group"s self-produced approach. The track listing reflects the group's genre fluidity, including the hip-hop collaboration "Consume" featuring Goon Des Garcons.

== Track listing ==
All tracks are written and produced by Chase Atlantic.

Chase Atlantic track listing
No.	Title	Length
1.	"Into It"	3:16
2.	"Cassie"	3:30
3.	"The Walls"	3:49
4.	"Dancer in the Dark"	4:12
5.	"Consume" (featuring Goon des Garcons)	4:27
6.	"Swim"	3:48
7.	"Triggered"	4:09
8.	"Ozone"	3:49
9.	"Keep It Up"	4:07
10.	"Angeline"	3:53
11.	"Okay"	3:32
12.	"23"	4:37
13.	"Drugs & Money" (New Mix)	3:59
14.	"Uncomfortable"	5:40
Total length:		56:56

== Personnel ==
- Mitchel Cave – vocals, production
- Clinton Cave – guitar, saxophone, keys, production
- Christian Anthony – vocals, guitar, production

== Charts ==
Chart performance for Chase Atlantic
Chart (2025)	Peak position
Belgian Albums (Ultratop Wallonia)	185

== Certifications ==
Certifications for Chase Atlantic
Region	Certification	Certified units/sales
Canada (Music Canada)	Gold	40,000^{‡}
New Zealand (RMNZ)	Gold	7,500^{‡}
^{‡} Sales+streaming figures based on certification alone.

== Release history ==
Release history and formats for Chase Atlantic
Region	Date	Format	Label
Worldwide	4 October 2017	Digital download; streaming; CD	Warner Records
Worldwide	20 April 2024	Vinyl	Warner Records
