= Chase Atlantic =

Australian band

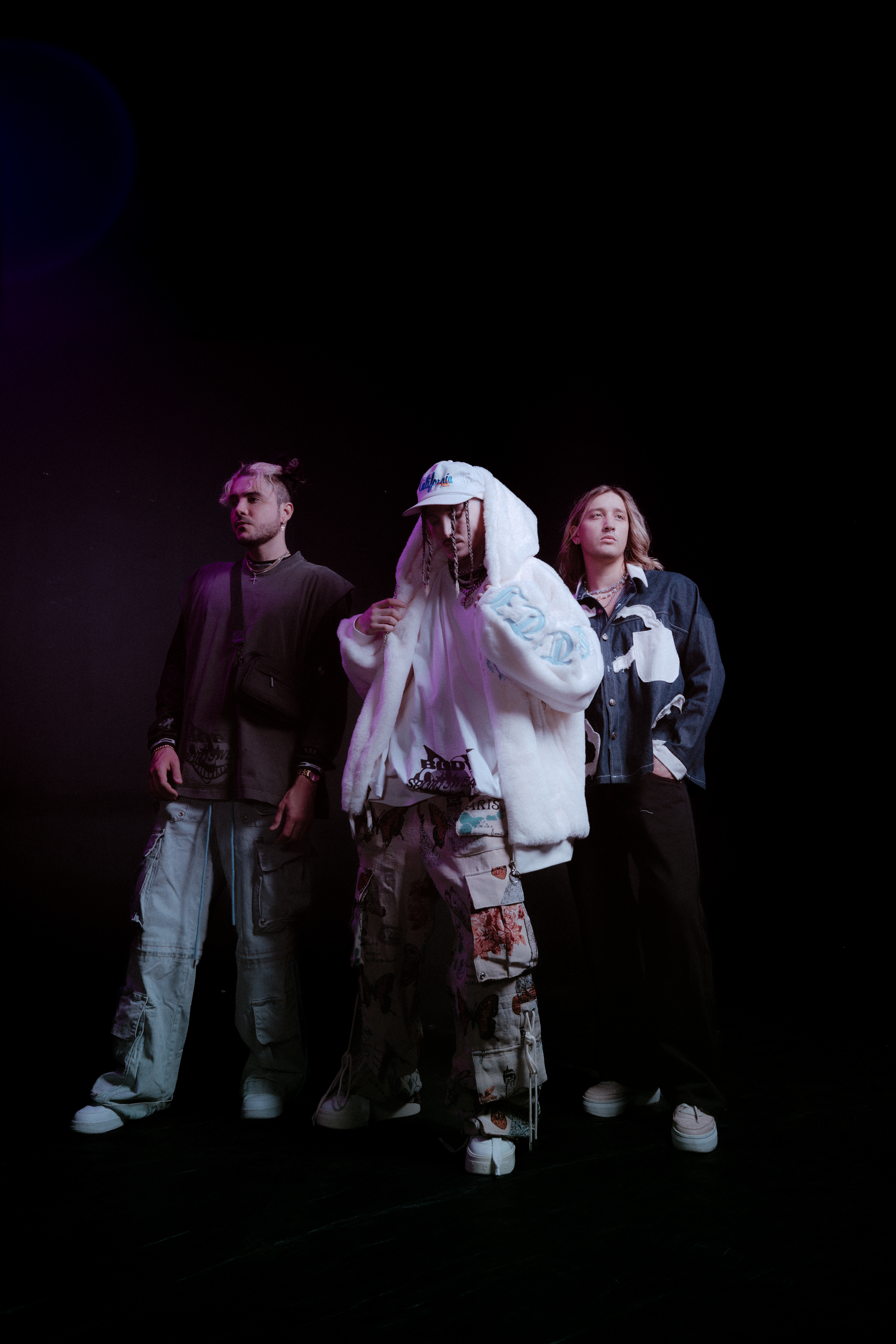
- Chase Atlantic in a 2024 photoshoot

Background information
- Origin: Cairns, Queensland, Australia
- Genres: Alternative R&B; trap; synth-pop; pop rock
- Years active: 2014–present
- Labels: Warner; BMG; Fearless
- Publisher: MDDN
- Spinoff of: What About Tonight; K.I.D.S (Kind Imaginations, Destructive Situations)
- Members: Mitchel Cave; Clinton Cave; Christian Anthony
- Website: chaseatlantic.com

Chase Atlantic (stylised in all caps) is an Australian R&B band from Cairns, Queensland, formed in 2014. The band consists of three members: Christian Anthony and brothers Mitchel and Clinton Cave, and have released seven EPs and four albums since their formation. They are most recognised for their 2017 hit single, "Swim".

== Career ==
=== 2012–2013: Before Chase Atlantic ===
Christian Anthony and Mitchel Cave were in a boy band called What About Tonight. They formed the band to audition for season 4 of The X Factor Australia. However, they were eliminated in week two, coming in eleventh place.

Mitchel Cave's older brother, Clinton Cave, had a successful YouTube channel, ClintonCaveMusic, where the brothers would release cover songs regularly. In 2012, the three released their first cover together which would be of Bruno Mars' "Locked Out of Heaven". During high school, the trio focused on producing music rather than performing, particularly Mitchel Cave as an EDM Producer. Later on, in 2013, they professionally performed together for the first time under the name K.I.D.S. (Kind Imaginations. Destructive Situations.) and released the original song "Addicted." They have since removed all content from the channel.

=== 2014–2015: Dalliance and Nostalgia ===
The trio first released music under the name Chase Atlantic when Clinton Cave recruited Mitchel and Christian to assist in recording a university project. The band would get their name, "Chase Atlantic" from nowhere. According to Mitchel, the name Chase Atlantic means nothing, it was a combination of two words that the band members liked, Chase and Atlantic, "We spend a couple of minutes trying to come up with a plausible and profound explanation for their band name. "It [Chase Atlantic] literally means nothing," says Cave. "It's so hard to find band names, we just put two words we really liked together that can't be associated with anything else." Chase Atlantic officially released their first EP Dalliance on 26 May 2014. Their early sound was often described as Pop Rock and Pop Punk.

In February 2015, the band released their second EP, Nostalgia, causing their song "Friends" to be associated with multiple Tumblr edits. "Friends" was also later certified Silver by the British Phonographic Industry (BPI) in 2022.

Later in 2015, the band caught the eye of Benji and Joel Madden, and they signed the group to their management company, MDDN, in early 2016.

=== 2016–2018: EPs and debut studio album ===
In January 2016, Chase Atlantic released "Obsessive". They followed up with their third EP, Paradise, in February 2016, which they promoted extensively.

In January 2017, Chase Atlantic released their fourth EP, Part One, to coincide with their signing with Warner Bros. Records. This was followed by Part Two in March 2017. In mid-2017, the band announced their first tour of the United States, opening for Sleeping with Sirens' Gossip: Up Close & Personal Tour. Chase Atlantic released Part Three in September 2017.

Their self-titled debut album, Chase Atlantic, was released in October 2017. Later in 2017, they went on a headlining tour in the United States, where they played 16 shows across 11 states, followed by an Australian tour opening for Blackbear. In March 2025, "Swim" became their first song to reach 1 billion streams on Spotify.

In 2018, the band continued touring the United States by opening for singer Lights and playing US and UK festivals, including Bonnaroo, Vans Warped Tour 2018, and Reading/Leeds Festival 2018.

They released standalone singles "Numb to the Feeling" and "Tidal Wave" in mid-2018. Later that year, they also left Warner Brothers Records and went independent.

=== 2019–2022: Phases and Beauty in Death ===
The group spent January to April 2019 in Los Angeles, working on their second album. In April, they announced the Phases Tour: North America for the summer of 2019, in support of their second album, Phases, and set the release date for 28 June 2019. The album was preceded by three singles, "Her", "StuckInMyBrain", and "Love Is (Not) Easy", which were released on 10 May, 24 May, and 7 June 2019, respectively.

In 2020, they began work on their third studio album, Beauty in Death, which the band released on 5 March 2021. Alongside their album rollout, they also released a collaborative single with dark pop artist Plvtinum, called "Hit My Line". In 2021, Chase Atlantic also embarked on their 'Beauty in Death' North American tour, performing across various cities from October 1 to November 17. On 2 May 2022, the group announced the release of a deluxe edition of Beauty in Death.

=== 2023–present: Return from Hiatus and Lost in Heaven ===
In 2023, after a break to work on themselves, Chase Atlantic made their return to the music scene with the release of the single "Mamacita" on 26 September. The track, which blends elements of alternative R&B and pop, marked the beginning of a new era for the band.

On 20 September 2024, they set the release of their next studio album, Lost in Heaven, for 1 November 2024. The album preceded three new singles "Die for Me", "Doubt It", and "Ricochet", released on 23 August, 20 September, and 11 October 2024, respectively, and would also include their previous release "Mamacita."

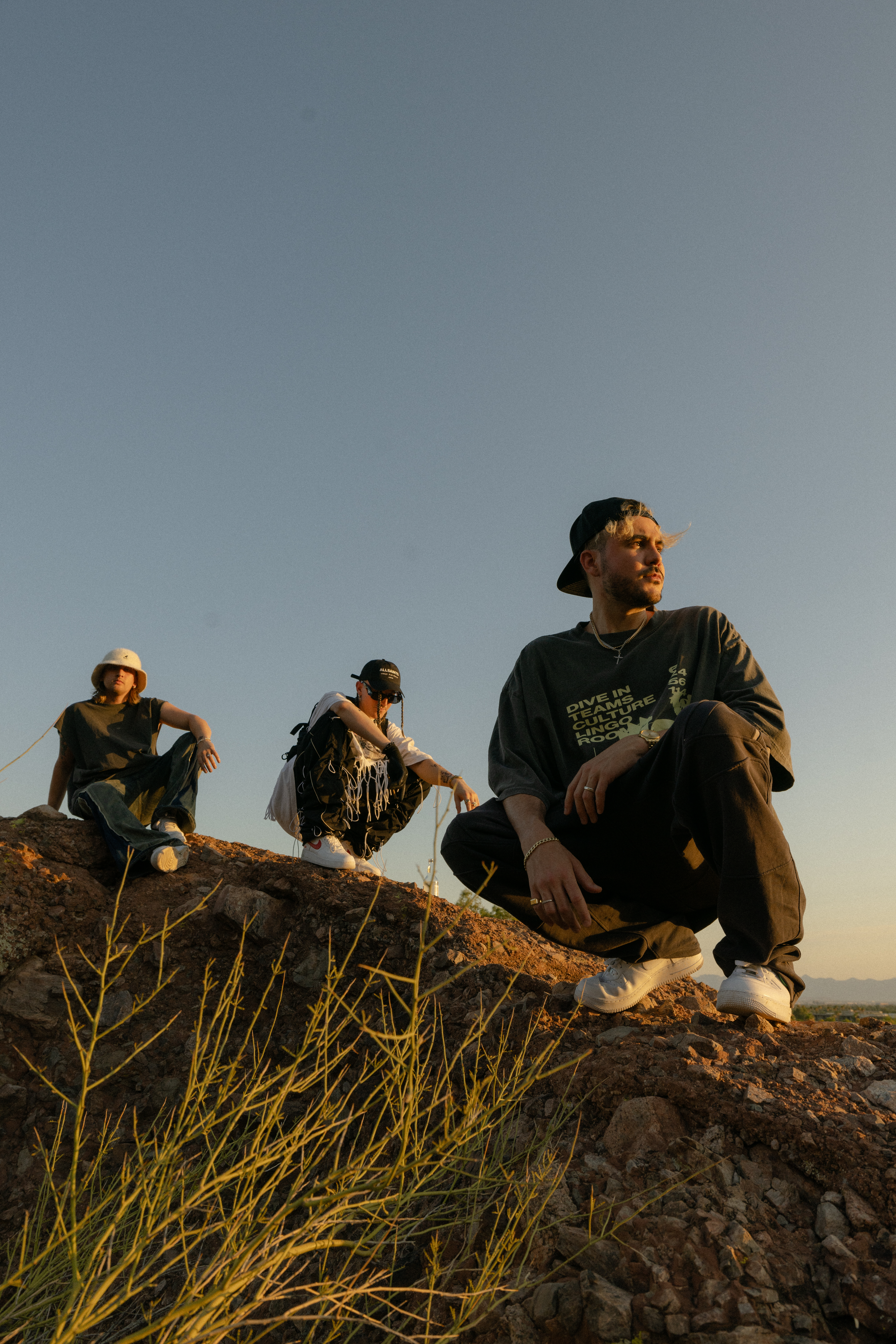
Chase Atlantic posing on a rocky terrain during golden hour.

During the production of Lost in Heaven, Chase Atlantic faced a significant setback when lead vocalist Mitchel Cave accidentally left his laptop in the rain, resulting in the loss of a substantial amount of their work. Reflecting on this incident, Cave explained, "We basically had to make a fifth album, because we lost so much of what we were gonna do." He further added, "I still don't keep any backups. I guess I like playing with fire. Or maybe I like the challenges, because none of our albums have been a piece of cake." Despite this challenge, the band persevered, reworking the lost material and ultimately releasing the album to critical acclaim.

On 16 October 2024, Chase Atlantic embarked on their Lost in Heaven Tour, with performances scheduled at multiple venues worldwide, which include The Toyota Music Factory in North America, the Riverstage Brisbane in Australia, The O2 Arena in United Kingdom, and the Lanxess Arena in Europe.

In a podcast interview with The Zach Sang Show, released on 13 February 2025, Chase Atlantic announced that they are working on a deluxe edition of their album Lost in Heaven. Christian Anthony described this upcoming release as "an extension of the story on Aura and Void," featuring material that "didn't make the album." The deluxe edition aims to expand upon the themes explored in the original release, incorporating additional tracks that complement the existing narrative.

On 14 August and 12 September 2025, the trio released the singles "Facedown" and "Remind Me" respectively, which were announced as part of the deluxe edition of Lost in Heaven, titled Lost in Heaven (High as Hell), released on October 3, 2025. The deluxe edition included two additional tracks, "Warcry" and "Victory Lap", the latter featuring alternative rock singer De'Wayne, and Australian singer-songwriter Larissa Lambert.

On the 2 October 2025 episode of Artist Friendly with Joel Madden, the band announced a forthcoming concert film set for theatres, documenting their sold-out performance at The O2 Arena in London. During the interview, they also stated that their most recent tour at-the-time of publication had sold more than 250,000 tickets.

== Music style ==
In 2018, the band described their music as "dark alternative pop punctuated by rock and R&B". Over time, their sound has encompassed alternative pop and alternative R&B, with their influences including Tame Impala, the Weeknd, the 1975, and The Neighbourhood. In 2025, with the release of Lost in Heaven, the band shifted toward hip-hop, pop, and electronic music, according to YouTube Music.

== Band members ==
=== Members ===
- Mitchel Cave – lead vocals, programming
- Christian Anthony – rhythm guitar, lead vocals, programming
- Clinton Cave – lead guitar, tenor saxophone, backing vocals, programming

=== Touring members ===
- Patrick Wilde – guitars, bass
- Jesse Boyle – drums, percussion, bass
- Ben "Benchiki" Chambers - producer

== Tours and appearances ==
=== Headlining tours ===
- Chase Atlantic at Metro Lair (2014): Chase Atlantic's first headlining tour took place in 2014, at Metro Theatre in Sydney.
  Promotional poster for Chase Atlantic's first headlining tour
- Nostalgia Tour (2015): Chase Atlantic's second headlining tour took place in 2015, during which the band performed at small venues across several Australian cities, including Brisbane, Sydney, and Melbourne. The setlist primarily featured tracks from their Dalliance EP, Nostalgia EP, and various cover songs.
- Paradise Tour (2016): In 2016, they embarked on a small tour across three venues in Australia, before going back to the United States, to promote and tease their then-unreleased Paradise EP.
- Chase Atlantic: The Tour (2017): Named after their self-titled album Chase Atlantic, the tour featured performances across North America.
- 2018 World Tour: In 2018, Chase Atlantic embarked on their 'World Tour 2018' from October to December featuring supporting acts Cherry Pools, Xaiver Mayne and Riley.
- Phases Tour (2019): In 2019, the band toured extensively across North America and Europe to support their second album, Phases. The tour featured performances in major cities, highlighting the band's rising popularity
- Beauty in Death Tour (2021): In 2021, Chase Atlantic embarked on their 'Beauty in Death' North American tour, performing across various cities from October 1 to November 17.
- Cold Nights Tour (2022): The Cold Nights Tour was announced in 2022, marking a return to Australia and New Zealand for the band. This tour included stops in major cities such as Melbourne, Sydney, Brisbane, and Auckland.
- Live in Brazil (2023): From May 6–9, 2023, Chase Atlantic toured in Brazil at several venues; Audio in São Paulo and Fundição Progresso in Rio de Janeiro.
- Lost in Heaven Tour (2024–2025): The Lost in Heaven Tour was announced on 20 August 2024. The tour, currently scheduled for venues in North America, Oceania, Europe, and Japan to support their fourth studio album, Lost in Heaven.

=== Supporting tours ===
- Gossip World Tour (2017): Chase Atlantic joined Sleeping with Sirens on their Gossip World Tour in 2017, which allowed them to reach a broader audience in the alternative music scene.
- We Were Here Tour (2018): From January 30 to March 17, 2018, Chase Atlantic joined Lights on her "We Were Here Tour", performing as an opening act alongside DCF.
- Good Charlotte's Australian Tour (2018): Chase Atlantic supported Good Charlotte during their tour, performing at Sydney's Hordern Pavilion on March 26 and Brisbane's Riverstage on March 28. Their setlists featured tracks like "Angeline", "Triggered", and "Cassie".

=== Festival appearances ===
- Spring Beats Concert (2014): On 24 September 2014, Chase Atlantic performed alongside various other emerging artists at the Spring Beats Concert held in Parramatta, Sydney.
- Summerfest (2015): Chase Atlantic performed at Summerfest on June 27, 2015, sharing the stage with acts like Walk the Moon, MisterWives, and The Griswolds.
- Warped Rewind at Sea (2017)
- Download Festival (2018): Chase Atlantic performed at the inaugural Australian edition of Download Festival, held on March 24 at Melbourne's Flemington Racecourse, sharing the stage with prominent acts like Korn, Limp Bizkit, and Good Charlotte.
- Bonnaroo (2018): Chase Atlantic performed at the Bonnaroo Music & Arts Festival in Manchester, Tennessee, sharing the lineup with Dua Lipa, Billie Ellish, and Paramore.
- Vans Warped Tour (2018): Chase Atlantic participated in the Vans Warped Tour, performing at various dates across the United States alongside bands such as Simple Plan, The Maine, and Mayday Parade
- Firefly Music Festival (2018): In June, Chase Atlantic performed in Dover, Delaware, sharing the stage with headliners like Eminem, Kendrick Lamar, Arctic Monkeys, and The Killers.
- Pukkelpop (2018): In August 2018, Chase Atlantic performed at Pukkelpop, a prominent Belgian music festival held in Hasselt.
- Sunfest (2022): In April 2022, Chase Atlantic performed at SunFest in West Palm Beach, Florida, delivering a setlist that included tracks like "The Walls," "Slide", and "Swim."
- Lollapalooza (2023): In 2023, they performed at Lollapalooza, one of the most renowned music festivals in the world, helping them gain more international exposure.
- So What?! Music Festival (2022): In May 2022, Chase Atlantic performed in Arlington, Texas, sharing the stage with artists such as 2 Chainz, Waka Flocka, and Riley.
- Reading and Leeds Festivals (2023): Chase Atlantic also took the stage at the Reading and Leeds Festivals in 2023, two of the UK's most prestigious music events, which solidified their reputation in the alternative music scene
- Encontro das Tribos Circus (2023): Chase Atlantic performed at the Encontro das Tribos Circus festival in São Paulo, Brazil, on May 7, 2023.
- Summer Sonic Festival (2025): From August 16–17, they headlined for Summer Sonic, sharing the stage with Fall Out Boy and Yungblud.

== Discography ==
- Chase Atlantic (2017)
- Phases (2019)
- Beauty in Death (2021)
- Lost in Heaven (2024)

== Awards and nominations ==
=== American Australian Association ===
Year	Association	Award	Outcome
2018	American Australian Association	AAA Rising Star Award	Won
