= Avenged Sevenfold discography =

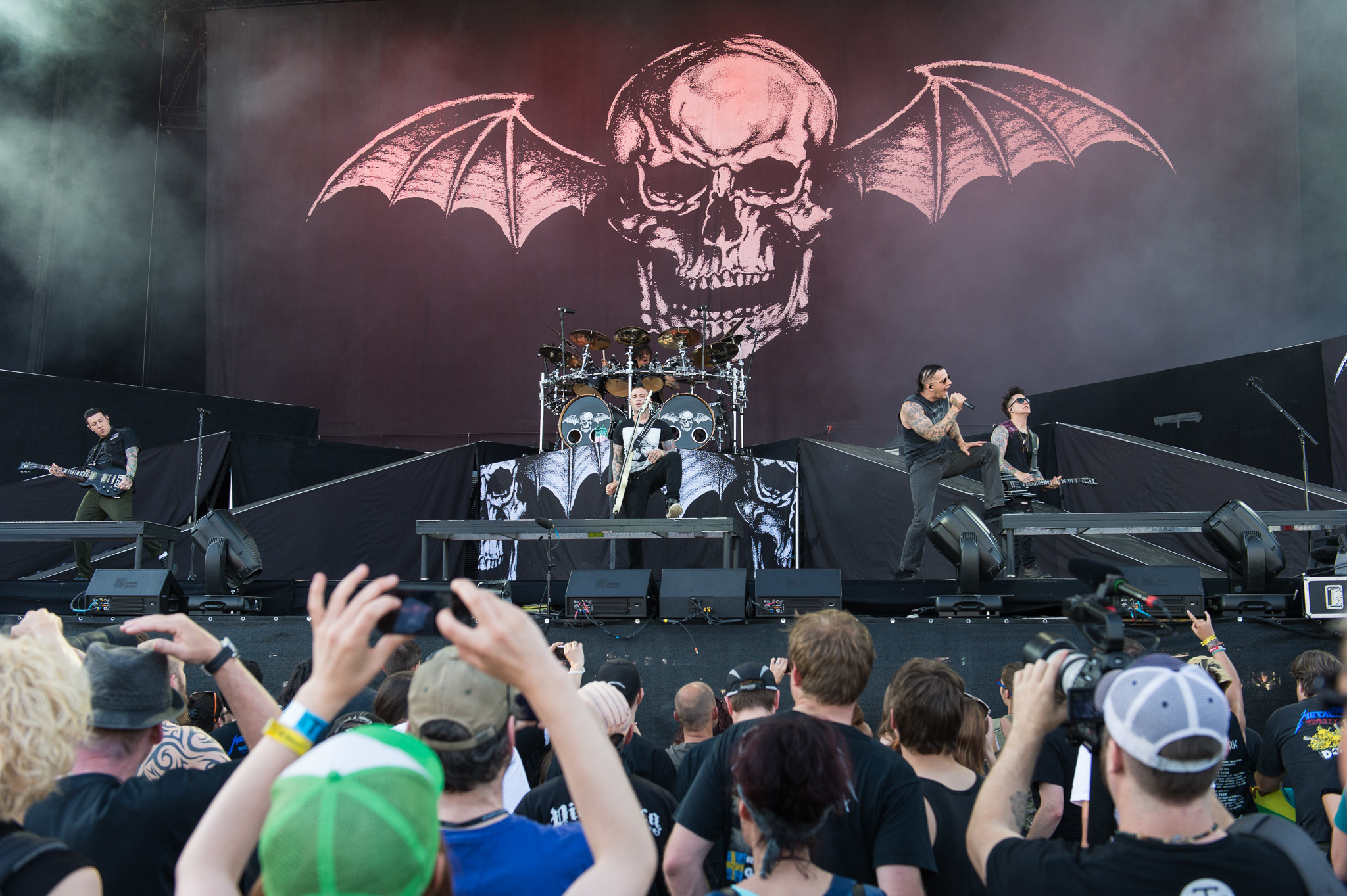
- Avenged Sevenfold in 2014
- Studio albums: 8
- Extended plays: 3
- Soundtrack albums: 1
- Live albums: 1
- Compilation albums: 2
- Singles: 25
- Video albums: 1
- Music videos: 32
- Promotional singles: 7

American heavy metal band Avenged Sevenfold has released eight studio albums, three extended plays, one soundtrack album, one live album, two compilation albums, 24 singles, seven promotional singles, one video album and 32 music videos. Formed in Huntington Beach, California in 1999, the band originally featured vocalist M. Shadows (Matthew Sanders), guitarist Zacky Vengeance (Zachary Baker), bassist Matt Wendt and drummer The Rev (James Sullivan). Synyster Gates (Brian Haner Jr.) joined as lead guitarist in 2001, just after the group released their debut album Sounding the Seventh Trumpet on Good Life Recordings, which was later reissued on Hopeless Records.

After replacing Wendt with Justin Sane and later Dameon Ash, Avenged Sevenfold settled on Johnny Christ (Jonathan Seward) on bass in 2003 to record Waking the Fallen. The album was released in August of that year, but did not chart at that time. The 2005 follow-up City of Evil reached number 30 on the Billboard 200 US albums chart, and was certified Platinum by the Recording Industry Association of America (RIAA) in 2009. The single "Bat Country" reached the top ten of the US Billboard Alternative Songs and Mainstream Rock charts, while "Beast and the Harlot" topped the UK Rock & Metal Singles Chart.

In 2007 the band released its self-titled fourth album, which was the first to reach the top five of the Billboard 200 when it peaked at number 4. The All Excess video, released earlier in the year, topped the Billboard Music Video Sales chart and reached number 2 on the UK Music Video Chart. Avenged Sevenfold was the band's final full release to feature The Rev, who died of an accidental overdose of prescription drugs and alcohol on December 28, 2009, while they were producing their next album Nightmare. Mike Portnoy performed drums on 2010s Nightmare, which topped the Billboard 200, the first charttopper in the band's career. Lead single "Nightmare" topped the Billboard Heatseekers Songs chart, while third single "So Far Away" became the band's first to top the Mainstream Rock chart. 2011's "Not Ready to Die" topped the UK Rock & Metal Singles Chart.

Arin Ilejay joined as The Rev's second replacement in 2013, performing on the band's sixth studio album Hail to the King. The album followed Nightmare by topping the Billboard 200, as well as being the group's first release to reach number 1 on the Canadian and UK Albums Charts. "Hail to the King" and "Shepherd of Fire" both topped the Mainstream Rock chart. In 2014, a re-released Waking the Fallen: Resurrected reached number 10 in the US, 11 years after the original album was released. The album would be certified Platinum by the RIAA in 2021.

Brooks Wackerman replaced Ilejay in 2015, and the following year the band released The Stage without any prior announcement. The album reached number 4 on the Billboard 200 and topped the Canadian Albums Chart. In 2017, the band began to add to The Stage as part of an "evolving track listing" that would eventually become the album's deluxe version, including cover versions of "God Only Knows" by The Beach Boys, "As Tears Go By" by The Rolling Stones and "Wish You Were Here" by Pink Floyd. Avenged Sevenfold released Live at the Grammy Museum on December 8, 2017, documenting the group's first acoustic performance at the Grammy Museum in October.

After four years of writing and recording, the band released their eighth studio album, Life Is But a Dream... on June 2, 2023, and it peaked at number 13 in the US the same month.

== Albums ==
=== Studio albums ===
List of studio albums, with selected chart positions, sales figures and certifications
Title	Album details	Peak chart positions										Sales	Certifications
Title	Album details	US	AUS	CAN	FIN	GER	JPN	NOR	NZ	SWE	UK	Sales	Certifications
Sounding the Seventh Trumpet	Released: July 24, 2001; Label: Good Life; Formats: CD, LP	—	—	—	—	—	176 (Note: Sounding the Seventh Trumpet and Waking the Fallen charted as a double album set in Japan.)	—	—	—	—		
Waking the Fallen	Released: August 26, 2003; Label: Hopeless; Formats: CD, LP	10 (Note: Waking the Fallen charted in the US upon the release of Waking the Fallen: Resurrected in 2014.)	34 (Note: Waking the Fallen charted in Australia upon the release of Waking the Fallen: Resurrected in 2014.)	—	—	48	176	—	—	—	35 (Note: Waking the Fallen charted in the UK upon the release of Waking the Fallen: Resurrected in 2014.)		RIAA: Platinum; BPI: Gold; MC: Gold
City of Evil	Released: June 6, 2005; Label: Warner Bros.; Formats: CD, LP	30	—	55	—	—	16	—	—	—	63	US: 1,500,000	RIAA: Platinum; BPI: Gold; MC: Gold
Avenged Sevenfold	Released: October 30, 2007; Label: Warner Bros.; Formats: CD, LP, CD+DVD	4	37	6	—	—	12	—	—	—	24	US: 1,100,000	RIAA: Platinum; BPI: Gold; RMNZ: Gold
Nightmare	Released: July 23, 2010; Label: Warner Bros.; Formats: CD, LP, DL	1	9	2	1	36	12	14	2	9	5	US: 1,000,000	RIAA: Platinum; BPI: Gold; MC: Platinum; RMNZ: Gold
Hail to the King	Released: August 27, 2013; Label: Warner Bros.; Formats: CD, LP, DL	1	2	1	1	5	15	3	3	4	1	US: 1,000,000	RIAA: Platinum; BPI: Gold; MC: Platinum; RMNZ: Gold
The Stage	Released: October 28, 2016; Label: Capitol; Formats: CD, LP, DL	4	4	1	10	14	42	16	9	37	13	US: 170,000	
Life Is But a Dream...	Released: June 2, 2023; Label: Warner; Formats: CD, LP, DL	13	46	11	20	27	46	—	29	—	21		
"—" denotes a release that did not chart or was not issued in that region.

=== Live albums ===
List of live albums
Title	Album details
Live at the Grammy Museum	Released: December 8, 2017; Label: Capitol; Format: DL

=== Compilations ===
List of compilation albums, with selected chart positions and certifications
Title	Album details	Peak chart positions										Certifications
Title	Album details	US	US Alt.	US Hard	US Rock	CAN	IRL	JPN	NZ	UK	UK Rock	Certifications
Live in the LBC & Diamonds in the Rough	Released: September 16, 2008; Label: Warner Bros.; Formats: CD+DVD	24	7	6	9	16	54	44	29	42	3	RIAA: Platinum
The Best of 2005–2013	Released: December 2, 2016; Label: Warner Bros.; Formats: 2CD, DL	—	18	7	28	—	—	—	—	—	—	
"—" denotes a release that did not chart or was not issued in that region.

== Extended plays ==
Title	Album details
Warmness on the Soul	Released: April 10, 2001; Label: Good Life Recordings; Format: CD
Black Reign	Released: September 21, 2018; Label: Warner Bros.; Format: 10", DL
Statica	Released: July 24, 2026; Label: Self-released; Format: DL, streaming

== Singles ==
List of singles, with selected chart positions and certifications, showing year released and album name
Title	Year	Peak chart positions										Certifications	Album
Title	Year	US	US Active Rock.	US Alt.	US Hard Rock Digital	US Main.	US Rock	CAN	CAN Rock	UK	UK Rock	Certifications	Album
"Unholy Confessions"	2004	—	—	—	—	—	×	—	—	—	—	RIAA: Platinum	Waking the Fallen
"Burn It Down"	2005	—	—	—	—	—	×	—	—	92	7		City of Evil
"Bat Country"	2005	60	1	6	—	2	×	—	—	84	3	RIAA: Platinum; BPI: Silver; RMNZ: Gold	City of Evil
"Beast and the Harlot"	2006	—	16	40	—	19	×	—	—	44	1		City of Evil
"Walk" (Note: "Walk" was originally released on the High Voltage!: A Brief History of Rock compilation.)	2007	—	—	—	—	—	×	—	—	—	—		Diamonds in the Rough
"Critical Acclaim" (Note: "Critical Acclaim" was released as a downloadable single only.)	2007	—	—	—	—	—	×	—	—	—	—		Avenged Sevenfold
"Almost Easy"	2007	— (Note: "Almost Easy" peaked at number 6 on the Billboard Bubbling Under Hot 100 Singles chart, which acts as an extension of the Billboard Hot 100.)	2	6	—	3	×	—	—	67	1	RIAA: Platinum	Avenged Sevenfold
"Afterlife"	2008	—	8	20	16	11	×	—	—	197	3	BPI: Silver; RMNZ: Gold	Avenged Sevenfold
"Crossroads"	2008	—	—	—	—	—	×	—	—	—	—		Diamonds in the Rough
"Dear God"	2008	—	—	—	—	—	×	—	—	—	3		Avenged Sevenfold
"Nightmare"	2010	51	1	12	14	2	3	48	49	65	2	RIAA: 2× Platinum; BPI: Gold; RMNZ: Gold	Nightmare
"Welcome to the Family"	2010	— (Note: "Welcome to the Family" peaked at number 10 on the Billboard Bubbling Under Hot 100 Singles chart, which acts as an extension of the Billboard Hot 100.)	1	15	19	2	8	—	48	—	8		Nightmare
"So Far Away"	2011	—	1	15	21	1	5	—	41	—	—		Nightmare
"Not Ready to Die"	2011	70	—	— (Note: "Not Ready to Die" did not enter the US Billboard Alternative Airplay chart, but peaked at number 2 on the US Alternative Digital Song Sales chart.)	1	—	— (Note: "Not Ready to Die" did not enter the US Billboard Hot Rock songs chart, but peaked at number 3 on the US Rock Digital Song Sales chart.)	73	—	126	1		Call of Duty: Black Ops
"Carry On"	2012	— (Note: "Carry On" peaked at number 25 on the Billboard Bubbling Under Hot 100 Singles chart, which acts as an extension of the Billboard Hot 100.)	1	— (Note: "Carry On" did not enter the US Billboard Alternative Airplay chart, but peaked at number 11 on the US Alternative Digital Song Sales chart.)	1	2	20	—	—	119	2		Call of Duty: Black Ops II
"Hail to the King"	2013	83	1	23	1	1	12	63	8	76	4	RIAA: 3× Platinum; BPI: Gold; MC: 4× Platinum; IFPI DEN: Gold; RMNZ: Platinum	Hail to the King
"Shepherd of Fire"	2013	—	16	34	11	1	28	—	31	—	12	RIAA: Platinum; BPI: Silver; RMNZ: Gold	Hail to the King
"The Stage"	2016	— (Note: "The Stage" peaked at number 7 on the Billboard Bubbling Under Hot 100 Singles chart, which acts as an extension of the Billboard Hot 100.)	— (Note: "The Stage" did not enter the US Billboard Active Rock chart, but peaked at number 20 on the US Rock & Alternative Airplay chart.)	— (Note: "The Stage" did not enter the US Billboard Alternative Airplay chart, but peaked at number 7 on the US Alternative Digital Song Sales chart.)	1	4	10	—	—	—	7		The Stage
"God Damn"	2017	—	— (Note: "God Damn" did not enter the US Billboard Active Rock chart, but peaked at number 37 on the US Rock & Alternative Airplay chart.)	—	—	9	37	—	—	—	—		The Stage
"Wish You Were Here"	2017	—	— (Note: "Wish You Were Here" did not enter the US Billboard Active Rock chart, but peaked at number 31 on the US Rock & Alternative Airplay chart.)	—	15	16	37	—	—	—	—		The Stage (Deluxe Edition)
"Mad Hatter"	2018	—	— (Note: "Mad Hatter" did not enter the US Billboard Active Rock chart, but peaked at number 31 on the US Rock & Alternative Airplay chart.)	—	6	9	28	—	—	—	—		Call of Duty: Black Ops 4
"Set Me Free"	2020	—	—	—	3	—	22	—	—	—	—		Diamonds in the Rough (Rerelease)
"Nobody"	2023	—	— (Note: "Nobody" did not enter the US Billboard Active Rock chart, but peaked at number 5 on the US Rock & Alternative Airplay chart.)	—	4	2	28	—	—	—	—		Life Is But a Dream...
"Mattel"	2023	—	— (Note: "Mattel" did not enter the US Billboard Active Rock chart, but peaked at number 49 on the US Rock & Alternative Airplay chart.)	—	—	17	—	—	—	—	—		Life Is But a Dream...
"Magic"	2025	—	—	—	—	—	—	—	—	—	—		Call of Duty: Black Ops 7
"—" denotes a release that did not chart or was not issued in that region. "×" denotes periods where charts did not exist or were not archived.

=== Promotional singles ===
Title	Year	Peak chart positions				Album
Title	Year	US Alt.	US Main.	US Rock	US Hard Digi.	Album
"Darkness Surrounding"	2001	—	—	×	×	Sounding the Seventh Trumpet
"An Epic of Time Wasted"	2001	—	—	×	×	Sounding the Seventh Trumpet
"Eternal Rest" / "Chapter Four"	2003	—	—	×	×	Waking the Fallen
"Seize the Day"	2006	—	17	×	×	City of Evil
"Scream"	2008	26	9	×	×	Avenged Sevenfold
"Buried Alive"	2011	26	2	10	20	Nightmare
"We Love You"/"We Love You Moar" (solo or with Pussy Riot)	2023	— (Note: "We Love You" did not enter the US Billboard Alternative Airplay Chart, but peaked at number 21 on the US Alternative Digital Song Sales chart.)	—	—	12	Life Is But a Dream...
"—" denotes a release that did not chart or was not issued in that region. "×" denotes periods where charts did not exist or were not archived.

== Other charted and certified songs ==
List of songs, with selected chart positions, showing year released, certifications and album name
Title	Year	Peak chart positions								Certifications	Album
Title	Year	US Hard Rock	US Hard Digi.	US Main.	US Rock	US Rock Digi.	US Sales	UK	UK Rock	Certifications	Album
"Lost It All"	2010	—	—	—	—	—	—	165	6		Nightmare (Deluxe Edition)
"St. James"	2013	—	2	—	—	42	—	—	36		Hail to the King (Deluxe Edition)
"This Means War"	2014	—	—	4	36	—	—	—	—	RIAA: Gold	Hail to the King
"I Won't See You Tonight"	2014	—	—	—	—	—	2	—	—		Waking the Fallen: Resurrected
"Paradigm"	2016	—	—	—	50	—	—	—	—		The Stage
"Game Over"	2023	6	—	—	34	— (Note: "Game Over" did not enter the US Billboard Rock Digital Songs Chart, but peaked at number 23 on the US Alternative Songs chart.)	—	—	—		Life Is But a Dream...
"Cosmic"	2023	19	—	—	—	—	—	—	—		Life Is But a Dream...
"—" denotes a release that did not chart or was not issued in that region.

== Other appearances ==
List of other appearances, showing year released and album name
Song	Year	Album	Comments
"Lips of Deceit"	2000	Feel the Pain	Taken from the 1999 and 2000 demos.
"Lips of Deceit" "We Come Out at Night"	2000	This Means War: Hardcores Finest	Taken from the 1999 and 2000 demos.
"Thick and Thin"	2000	Scrape III	Taken from the 1999 and 2000 demos.
"We Come Out at Night"	2000	Goodlife 4	Taken from the 1999 and 2000 demos.
"Second Heartbeat" "Darkness Surrounding"	2002	Hopelessly Devoted to You Vol. 4	"Second Heartbeat" is a previously unreleased demo/alternate version, later released on the iTunes deluxe version of Waking the Fallen.
"Chapter Four" "Eternal Rest" (live)	2004	Hopelessly Devoted to You Vol. 5	"Eternal Rest" was recorded at the Ventura Theater and later released on the iTunes deluxe version of Waking the Fallen.
"Beast and the Harlot" (live)	2005	Masters of Horror	Recorded live at Warped Tour 2005. Previously released on the Bat Country single.
"Walk" (Pantera cover)	2006	High Voltage!: A Brief History of Rock	Later released on Diamonds in the Rough, in 2008.
"Flash of the Blade" (Iron Maiden cover)	2008	Maiden Heaven: A Tribute to Iron Maiden	Later released on Diamonds in the Rough, in 2008.
"Paranoid" (Black Sabbath cover)	2009	Covered, A Revolution in Sound	Later released on Diamonds in the Rough, in 2020.
"Jade Helm"	2015	Call of Duty: Black Ops III	Later released on Black Reign.

== Videos ==
=== Video albums ===
List of video albums, with selected chart positions
Title	Album details	Chart peaks		
Title	Album details	US	AUS	UK
All Excess	Released: July 17, 2007; Label: Warner Bros.; Format: DVD	1	19	2

=== Music videos ===
List of music videos, showing year released and director(s) name
Title	Year	Director(s)	Ref.
"Warmness on the Soul"	2001	Broken Robot, Militont	
"Unholy Confessions" (version 1)	2004	Greg Kaplan	
"Unholy Confessions" (version 2)	2004	Greg Kaplan	
"Burn It Down"	2005	Nick Wickham	
"Bat Country"	2005	Marc Klasfeld	
"Beast and the Harlot"	2006	Tony Petrossian	
"Seize the Day"	2006	Wayne Isham	
"Almost Easy"	2007	P. R. Brown	
"A Little Piece of Heaven"	2007	Rafa Alcantara	
"Afterlife"	2008	Wayne Isham	
"Dear God"	2008	Rafa Alcantara	
"Nightmare"	2010	Wayne Isham	
"So Far Away"	2011	Wayne Isham	
"Carry On"	2012	Dave Anthony	
"Hail to the King"	2013	Syndrome	
"Shepherd of Fire"	2013	Wayne Isham	
"This Means War"	2014	Rafa Alcantara	
"Chapter Four"	2014	Rafa Alcantara	
"The Stage"	2016	Chris Hopewell	
"God Damn"	2017	Anders Rostad	
"Malagueña Salerosa (La Malagueña)"	2017	Rafa Alcantara	
"Retrovertigo"	2017	Rafa Alcantara	
"Dose"	2017	Rafa Alcantara	
"Runaway"	2017	Rafa Alcantara	
"God Only Knows"	2017	Rafa Alcantara	
"As Tears Go By"	2017	Rafa Alcantara	
"Wish You Were Here"	2017	Rafa Alcantara	
"Nobody"	2023	Chris Hopewell	
"We Love You"	2023	Ryan McKinnon	
"Mattel"	2023	Zoe Katz	
"Cosmic"	2024	Chris Hopewell	
"Magic"	2025	Ryan McKinnon	
"STATICA"	2026	Lance Drake	
