= The Best of 2005–2013 =

Compilation album by Avenged Sevenfold
- Released: December 2, 2016
- Recorded: 2005–2013
- Genre: Heavy metal
- Length: 95:39
- Label: Warner Bros.
- Producers: Avenged Sevenfold; Mike Elizondo; Mudrock; Terry Date

Avenged Sevenfold chronology
| The Stage (2016) | The Best of 2005–2013 (2016) | Live at the Grammy Museum (2017) |

The Best of 2005–2013 is a greatest hits album by American heavy metal band Avenged Sevenfold, released by Warner Bros. Records on December 2, 2016. The album covers songs from all of the band's albums released under Warner Bros., from City of Evil to Hail to the King, including covers and one-off singles released in between. The band members themselves have not endorsed or supported this album due to it being released without their consent, knowledge or involvement. The album has since been removed from digital streaming services including Spotify and Apple Music.

== Background ==
In early 2016, Avenged Sevenfold left Warner Bros. for Capitol Records, resulting in a legal battle between the record label and the band. In response to the allegedly-leaked release date of the band's seventh album, falsely leaked and titled Voltaic Oceans with a December 9 release date by Chris Jericho over Instagram, Warner Bros. announced The Best of 2005–2013, to be released one week prior to the leaked release date, on December 2. However, the band officially surprise-released the album as The Stage on October 28, to which the label quickly changed the release date to capitalize on traffic, but reverted to its December 2 release.

Singer M. Shadows has openly expressed disdain about the release of the greatest hits album without the band's knowledge, stating "You're gonna try to put this record out right before our new record just to undercut us and try to confuse the casual fan, like, 'Is this the new record? Or is that the new record?' Or parents buying stuff for Christmas. So it's just really childish."

== Track listing ==
Disc one
| No. | Title | Album | Length |
|---|---|---|---|
| 1. | "Bat Country" | City of Evil, 2005 | 5:11 |
| 2. | "Beast and the Harlot" | City of Evil, 2005 | 5:43 |
| 3. | "Seize the Day" | City of Evil, 2005 | 5:34 |
| 4. | "Critical Acclaim" | Avenged Sevenfold, 2007 | 5:15 |
| 5. | "Almost Easy" | Avenged Sevenfold, 2007 | 3:54 |
| 6. | "Afterlife" | Avenged Sevenfold, 2007 | 5:52 |
| 7. | "Dear God" | Avenged Sevenfold, 2007 | 6:33 |
| 8. | "A Little Piece of Heaven" | Avenged Sevenfold, 2007 | 8:00 |

Disc two
| No. | Title | Album | Length |
|---|---|---|---|
| 1. | "Nightmare" | Nightmare, 2010 | 6:14 |
| 2. | "Welcome to the Family" | Nightmare, 2010 | 4:05 |
| 3. | "So Far Away" | Nightmare, 2010 | 5:26 |
| 4. | "Hail to the King" | Hail to the King, 2013 | 5:05 |
| 5. | "Shepherd of Fire" | Hail to the King, 2013 | 5:23 |
| 6. | "Walk" (Pantera cover) | High Voltage!: A Brief History of Rock, 2006 | 5:20 |
| 7. | "Flash of the Blade" (Iron Maiden cover) | Maiden Heaven: A Tribute to Iron Maiden, 2008 | 4:01 |
| 8. | "Paranoid" (Black Sabbath cover) | Covered, A Revolution in Sound, 2009 | 2:43 |
| 9. | "Carry On" | Carry On, 2012 | 4:15 |
| 10. | "Not Ready to Die" | Not Ready to Die (from "Call of the Dead"), 2011 | 7:05 |

== Personnel ==
- M. Shadows – lead vocals
- Zacky Vengeance – rhythm guitar, backing vocals
- Synyster Gates – lead guitar, backing vocals
- Johnny Christ – bass, backing vocals
- The Rev – drums, backing vocals (all tracks on disc one, tracks 6–8 on disc two)
- Mike Portnoy – drums (tracks 1–3 on disc two)
- Arin Ilejay – drums (tracks 4–5, 9–10 on disc two)

== Charts ==
| Chart (2016) | Peak position |
|---|---|
| US Top Alternative Albums (Billboard) | 18 |
| US Top Hard Rock Albums (Billboard) | 7 |
| US Top Rock Albums (Billboard) | 28 |
