= A Little Piece of Heaven (song) =

Song by Avenged Sevenfold

from the album Avenged Sevenfold
- A-side: Scream
- Released: October 26, 2007
- Recorded: 2007
- Studio: Sunset Sound (Los Angeles); Eldorado (Hollywood); Burbank (Hollywood); Capitol (Hollywood)
- Genre: Avant-garde metal; dark cabaret
- Length: 8:01
- Label: Warner Bros.
- Songwriter: James Sullivan
- Producer: Avenged Sevenfold

Avenged Sevenfold track listing
- 10 tracks: 1. "Critical Acclaim"; 2. "Almost Easy"; 3. "Scream"; 4. "Afterlife"; 5. "Gunslinger"; 6. "Unbound (The Wild Ride)"; 7. "Brompton Cocktail"; 8. "Lost"; 9. "A Little Piece of Heaven"; 10. "Dear God"

"A Little Piece of Heaven" is a song by American heavy metal band Avenged Sevenfold. It is the ninth song from their self-titled fourth album. Though not released as a single, the song is one of the band's most popular. In December 2007, the song received an animated music video. The song was written by the band's drummer, Jimmy "The Rev" Sullivan, and features him on dueling lead vocals with M. Shadows.

== Background ==
"A Little Piece of Heaven" was written by drummer The Rev. The song's demo was titled "Big Bear", and featured The Rev doing all the instruments and vocals. It was originally intended to be on a Halloween EP, but once the band's record label heard it, they insisted it be on the album.

== Lyrics and music ==
"A Little Piece of Heaven" is about a man who, fearing that his proposal to her will be rejected, murders his girlfriend. He then eats her heart and rapes her corpse. The girlfriend then returns from the dead and murders him and eats his heart. The man then also comes back from the dead to make things right. The two reconcile, get married, and together they begin killing others.

The National described the song musically as avant-garde metal. Songwriter The Rev stated the song was inspired by the works of Danny Elfman and his band Oingo Boingo. The band worked with brass and string sections for the song.

Members of the band have compared the song to "an eight-minute movie".

== Music video ==
In December 2007, an animated video directed by Rafa Alcantra was made for "A Little Piece of Heaven". The video for the song features a man who, after having his marriage proposal rejected, murders his girlfriend. Due to the song's subject matter, Warner Brothers initially only released it to registered MVI users over the internet. However, it was later released to YouTube on October 26, 2009.

== Critical reception and legacy ==
Kerrang and Return of Rock ranked "A Little Piece of Heaven" at number 1 and number 3 respectively on their lists of the greatest Avenged Sevenfold songs, while Classic Rock History ranked it at number 5 and Louder Sound ranked it at number 11 on their respective lists. It was voted as the best Avenged Sevenfold song in an official song tournament during March Madness.

The music of the song has been compared to the bands Mr. Bungle and My Chemical Romance, as well as Broadway show tunes. It has also been described as the band's take on "Bohemian Rhapsody". The members of Fearless Vampire Killers had the song in their list of the best Avenged Sevenfold songs, calling it "Like a rock opera within one song".

The song has also been compared to the film scores of composer/musician Danny Elfman, specifically his scores to the films The Nightmare Before Christmas and Beetlejuice.

A live performance of the song was featured on the live album Live in the LBC.

== Personnel ==
All credits adapted from the album's liner notes.

Avenged Sevenfold

- M. Shadows – lead vocals
- The Rev – drums, co-lead vocals, piano, percussion
- Zacky Vengeance – rhythm guitar, spoken word
- Synyster Gates – lead guitar, backing vocals
- Johnny Christ – bass guitar, backing vocals

Session musicians

- Additional vocals by Juliette Commagere
- Piano and Organ by Jamie Muhoberac
- Upright bass by Miles Mosley
- Cello by Cameron Stone
- Violins by Caroline Campbell and Neel Hammond
- Viola by Andrew Duckles
- Choir: Beth Andersen, Monique Donnelly, Rob Giles, Debbie Hall, Scottie Haskell, Luana Jackman, Bob Joyce, Rock Logan, Susie Stevens Logan, Arnold McCuller, Gabriel Mann, and Ed Zajack
- Alto sax by Bill Liston and Brandon Fields
- Clarinet by Bill Liston and Rusty Higgins
- Tenor sax by Dave Boruff and Rusty Higgins
- Bari sax by Joel Peskin
- Trumpet by Wayne Bergeron and Dan Foreno
- Trombone by Bruce Fowler and Alex Iles

Production

- Produced by Avenged Sevenfold
- Engineered by Fred Archambault and Dave Schiffman, assisted by Clifton Allen, Chris Steffen, Robert DeLong, Aaron Walk, Mike Scielzi, and Josh Wilbur
- Mixed by Andy Wallace
- Mastered by Brian Gardner
- Drum tech by Mike Fasano
- Guitar tech by Walter Rice
- 'Fan Producers for a Day' (MVI) by Daniel McLaughlin and Christopher Guinn
