= Scream (Avenged Sevenfold song) =

Single by Avenged Sevenfold

from the album Avenged Sevenfold
- B-side: A Little Piece of Heaven
- Released: February 10, 2009
- Recorded: 2007
- Studio: Sunset Sound (Los Angeles); Eldorado (Hollywood); Burbank (Hollywood); Capitol (Hollywood)
- Genre: Groove metal
- Length: 4:50
- Label: Warner Bros.
- Songwriter: The Rev
- Producer: Avenged Sevenfold

Avenged Sevenfold singles chronology
"Dear God" (2008)	"Scream" (2009)	"Crossroads" (2008)

"Scream" is a song by American heavy metal band Avenged Sevenfold. It was released as the fifth and final single from their self-titled fourth studio album. The song reached number nine on the U.S. Mainstream Rock chart and number 26 on the U.S. Alternative chart.

"Scream" was released on July 27, 2010 as a downloadable track in Rock Band 2 along with "Nightmare" and "Seize the Day".

== Music video ==
On October 31, 2008, Avenged Sevenfold mentioned that fans of the band were eligible to make their own music video for the song. The video had to be submitted to YouTube before November 30, 2008. The winner and five runners-up of the contest were announced on December 15, 2008. The winner received a new MacBook Air computer that came with Avenged Sevenfold videos, music, and other items from the band. The winning video was also featured on the Avenged Sevenfold website, MySpace page, YouTube account, and Facebook account. The five runners-up in this contest received a copy of the DVD and CD Live in the LBC & Diamonds in the Rough, signed by the members of the band; in addition, a merchandise pack was also rewarded to these runners-up.

== Personnel ==
Avenged Sevenfold

- M. Shadows – lead vocals, backing vocals
- Zacky Vengeance – rhythm guitar, backing vocals
- The Rev - drums, co-lead vocals, percussion, piano, backing vocals
- Synyster Gates – lead guitar, backing vocals
- Johnny Christ – bass guitar, backing vocals

Session musicians

- Scream by Valary Sanders

Production

- Produced by Avenged Sevenfold
- Engineered by Fred Archambault and Dave Schiffman, assisted by Clifton Allen, Chris Steffen, Robert DeLong, Aaron Walk, Mike Scielzi, and Josh Wilbur
- Mixed by Andy Wallace
- Mastered by Brian Gardner
- Drum tech by Mike Fasano
- Guitar tech by Walter Rice
- 'Fan Producers for a Day' (MVI) by Daniel McLaughlin and Christopher Guinn

== Charts ==
Chart (2009)	Peak position
US Mainstream Rock (Billboard)	9
US Alternative Airplay (Billboard)	26
US Active Rock (Billboard)	7
US Heritage Rock (Billboard)	18
