= Strung Out on Avenged Sevenfold =

Strung Out on Avenged Sevenfold is the name of:

- Strung Out on Avenged Sevenfold: The String Tribute
- Strung Out on Avenged Sevenfold: Bat Wings and Broken Strings
