= Dear God (Avenged Sevenfold song) =

""Querido Dios""

Single by Avenged Sevenfold

from the album Avenged Sevenfold
- B-side: "Afterlife" (live version)
- Released: June 15, 2008
- Recorded: 2007
- Studio: Sunset Sound (Los Angeles); Eldorado (Hollywood); Burbank (Hollywood); Capitol (Hollywood)
- Genre: Country
- Length: 6:34
- Label: Warner Bros.
- Songwriters: Matt Sanders; Brian Haner Jr.; Jonathan Seward
- Producer: Avenged Sevenfold

Avenged Sevenfold singles chronology
"Afterlife" (2008)	""Querido Dios"" (2008)	"Scream" (2009)

"Dear God" is a country rock song by American heavy metal band Avenged Sevenfold. It was released as the fourth single from their self-titled fourth studio album, and is the closing track on the album.

== Overview ==
"Dear God" was released as the fourth single from the album. The song was a deviation from the band's usual heavy metal style, taking on more of a country feel. Johnny Christ stated that the inspiration for the song came from the band's friendship with country act Big & Rich. Their influence can be heard in the background vocals of MuzikMafia member Shanna Crooks.

== Track listing ==
CD
No.	Title	Length
1.	"Dear God"	6:34
2.	"Afterlife" (live video)

== Personnel ==
All credits adapted from the album's liner notes.

Avenged Sevenfold

- M. Shadows – lead vocals, backing vocals
- Zacky Vengeance – rhythm guitar, acoustic guitar, backing vocals
- The Rev - drums, percussion, piano, backing vocals
- Synyster Gates – lead guitar, backing vocals
- Johnny Christ – bass guitar, backing vocals

Session musicians

- Lap, pedal steel and banjo by Greg Leisz
- Additional vocals by Shanna Crooks

Production

- Produced by Avenged Sevenfold
- Engineered by Fred Archambault and Dave Schiffman, assisted by Clifton Allen, Chris Steffen, Robert DeLong, Aaron Walk, Mike Scielzi, and Josh Wilbur
- Mixed by Andy Wallace
- Mastered by Brian Gardner
- Drum tech by Mike Fasano
- Guitar tech by Walter Rice
- 'Fan Producers for a Day' (MVI) by Daniel McLaughlin and Christopher Guinn

== Charts ==
Chart (2008)	Peak position
UK Rock & Metal (Official Charts)	3
