= Live in the LBC & Diamonds in the Rough =

2008 live and compilation albums by Avenged Sevenfold

Live in the LBC

Live album / video album by Avenged Sevenfold
- Released: September 16, 2008
- Recorded: April 10, 2008
- Venue: Long Beach Arena, Long Beach, California
- Genre: Heavy metal
- Length: 76:49
- Label: Warner Bros.
- Director: Rafa Alcantara

Avenged Sevenfold chronology
Avenged Sevenfold (2007)	Live in the LBC (2008)	Nightmare (2010)

Diamonds in the Rough

Compilation album by Avenged Sevenfold
- Released: September 16, 2008
- Recorded: 2006–2008
- Genre: Heavy metal
- Length: 53:44
- Label: Warner Bros.
- Producer: Avenged Sevenfold

Avenged Sevenfold chronology
Avenged Sevenfold (2007)	Diamonds in the Rough (2008)	Nightmare (2010)

Singles from Diamonds in the Rough
- 1. "Crossroads" Released: February 19, 2008; 2. "Set Me Free" Released: January 17, 2020 (remastered re-release)

Live in the LBC & Diamonds in the Rough is the first live DVD and compilation album by American heavy metal band Avenged Sevenfold, released on September 16, 2008 by Warner Bros. Records. It features the band's April 10, 2008 show at Long Beach Arena headlining the Rockstar Taste of Chaos tour, while the CD contains previously unreleased B-sides that were recorded during the making of the band's self-titled 2007 album, plus covers and other never-before-heard material.

== Production and release ==
The DVD was directed by Core Entertainment's Rafa Alcantara, who also worked on the band's critically acclaimed 2007 road documentary All Excess.

On August 15, 2008, a trailer was released by Avenged Sevenfold on their YouTube channel. On September 5, 2008, Avenged Sevenfold released the live version of "Seize the Day" from the DVD through their Imeem account. "Unholy Confessions" and "Scream" were later streamed before the release as well.

There are two alternate mixes of songs on their self-titled album:

- The CLA Mix of "Almost Easy" is simply the original song as mixed by Chris Lord-Alge, instead of Andy Wallace. This includes the mixing of The Rev's vocal take as well as alternate vocals from M. Shadows.
- The alternate version of "Afterlife" features a different bridge and a string section throughout the entire song.

The Rev performs vocals on the tracks "Critical Acclaim", "Crossroads", "Flash of the Blade", "Almost Easy", "A Little Piece of Heaven" and "Afterlife".

Live in the LBC & Diamonds in the Rough has been certified Platinum by the RIAA. On November 5, 2008, the CD/DVD combo was certified Gold, but has now reached Platinum by selling over 100,000 (Video Longform platinum) copies.

In January 2020, Avenged Sevenfold released "Set Me Free", an unreleased song recorded during the Hail to the King recording sessions. They also announced that the song would be included in a remastered re-release of Live in the LBC & Diamonds in the Rough, expected to be released on March 6 and February 7, respectively. A limited edition clear vinyl of Diamonds in the Rough was also announced.

== Reception ==
Professional ratings
Review scores
Source	Rating
AllMusic	3/5 stars
IGN	8.0/10
World of Music	3.5/5 stars

The album received mixed to positive reviews upon release in 2008. Jim Kaz from IGN wrote "Avenged Sevenfold have proven that there is a way to successfully crossover and bend genres without alienating or insulting the base. With top-notch musicianship and a knack for pinching the best bits from different styles and eras, this is one band to keep pace with." Ultimate Guitar wrote "The CD feels very much like another fresh studio release if you haven't been exposed to the B-sides, while the DVD features a sound mix that is just as strong as if it was also recorded in the studio."

== Track listing ==
Live in the LBC (DVD)

No.	Title	Writer(s)	Length
1.	"Intro"		0:56
2.	"Critical Acclaim"	Matthew Sanders; James Sullivan; Zachary Baker; Brian Haner Jr.; Jonathan Seward	6:06
3.	"Second Heartbeat" (abridged)		5:07
4.	"Afterlife"	Sullivan	7:33
5.	"Beast and the Harlot"		6:00
6.	"Scream"	Sanders; Haner; Baker	6:24
7.	"Seize the Day"	Sanders; Haner; Sullivan	7:55
8.	"Walk" (Pantera cover, abridged and member from the audience on vocals)	Darrell Abbott; Vincent Abbott; Phil Anselmo; Rex Brown	2:12
9.	"Bat Country"	Sanders; Haner	6:01
10.	"Almost Easy"	Sullivan	5:38
11.	"Gunslinger"	Sanders; Haner	4:30
12.	"Unholy Confessions"	Sanders; Baker; Haner	7:25
13.	"A Little Piece of Heaven"	Sullivan	10:56
Total length:			76:49

Diamonds in the Rough (CD)

All tracks are written by Avenged Sevenfold (Matthew Sanders, Brian Haner Jr., James Sullivan, Zachary Baker and Jonathan Seward) except where noted.

No.	Title	Writer(s)	Original release	Length
1.	"Demons"		Previously unreleased	6:11
2.	"Girl I Know"		Previously unreleased	4:23
3.	"Crossroads"		Previously released as a single (2008)	4:30
4.	"Flash of the Blade" (Iron Maiden cover)	Bruce Dickinson	Maiden Heaven: A Tribute to Iron Maiden (2008)	4:01
5.	"Until the End"		Previously unreleased	4:44
6.	"Tension"		Previously unreleased	4:50
7.	"Walk" (Pantera cover)	Darrell Abbott; Vincent Abbott; Phil Anselmo; Rex Brown	High Voltage!: A Brief History of Rock (2006)	5:21
8.	"The Fight"		Previously unreleased	4:07
9.	"Dancing Dead"		Previously unreleased	5:49
10.	"Almost Easy (CLA Mix)"	Sullivan	Previously unreleased	3:53
11.	"Afterlife (Alternate Version)"	Sullivan	Previously unreleased	5:55
Total length:				53:44

Digital download tracks (pre-order bonus)

No.	Title	Writer(s)	Notes	Length
1.	"Almost Easy (Live from Seattle)"	Sullivan	Recorded on December 16, 2007, at the Showbox in Seattle, WA.	4:16
2.	"Bat Country (Live from Fresno)"	Sanders; Haner; Sullivan	Recorded on December 11, 2007, at the Rainbow Ballroom in Fresno, CA.	6:05
Total length:				10:21

Remastered version
No.	Title	Writer(s)	Original release	Length
12.	"St. James"	Brian Haner Jr.	Hail to the King deluxe version (2013)	5:02
13.	"Set Me Free"	Sanders; Haner; Baker; Sewerd	Previously unreleased	6:21
14.	"4:00 A.M."	Sullivan	"Welcome to the Family" (2010)	5:00
15.	"Lost It All"	Sanders; Sullivan	Nightmare Japanese version (2010)	3:51
16.	"Paranoid" (Black Sabbath cover)	Geezer Butler; Tony Iommi; Ozzy Osbourne; Bill Ward	Covered, A Revolution in Sound (2009)	2:42
Total length:				76:40

== Personnel ==
- M. Shadows – lead vocals, organ intro on "Critical Acclaim"
- Zacky Vengeance – rhythm guitar, co-lead guitar, backing vocals, acoustic guitar on "Seize the Day"
- The Rev – drums, percussion, co-lead vocals on "Critical Acclaim", "Afterlife" and "A Little Piece of Heaven", backing vocals
- Synyster Gates – lead guitar, backing vocals
- Johnny Christ – bass, lead vocals on intro of "Seize the Day", backing vocals

=== Diamonds in the Rough ===
Avenged Sevenfold

- M. Shadows – lead vocals
- Zacky Vengeance – rhythm guitar, backing vocals
- The Rev – drums, backing vocals, co-lead vocals on "Crossroads" and "Flash of the Blade"
- Synyster Gates – lead guitar, backing vocals
- Johnny Christ – bass, backing vocals

Additional personnel

- Papa Gates – orchestration on "Until the End"
- Mike Portnoy – drums, percussion on "4:00 A.M." and "Lost It All"
- Arin Ilejay – drums, percussion on "St. James" and "Set Me Free"

== Charts ==
=== Diamonds in the Rough ===
Chart (2008)	Peak position
Canadian Albums (Billboard)	16
Irish Albums (IRMA)	54
Japanese Albums (Oricon)	44
New Zealand Albums (RMNZ)	29
Scottish Albums (OCC)	40
UK Albums (OCC)	42
UK Rock & Metal Albums (OCC)	3
US Billboard 200	24

=== Diamonds in the Rough 2020 reissue ===
Chart (2020)	Peak position
Swiss Albums (Schweizer Hitparade)	80
US Billboard 200	130
Canadian Albums (Billboard)	100

== Certifications ==
Region	Certification	Certified units/sales
United States (RIAA)	Platinum	100,000^{^}
^{^} Shipments figures based on certification alone.
