= Afterlife (Avenged Sevenfold song) =

Single by Avenged Sevenfold

from the album Avenged Sevenfold
- Released: January 29, 2008
- Recorded: 2007
- Studio: Sunset Sound Recorders, Los Angeles; Eldorado Recording Studios, Los Angeles; Burbank & Capitol Studios, Los Angeles
- Genre: Thrash metal; symphonic metal
- Length: 5:52 (album version); 4:02 (radio edit)
- Label: Warner Bros.
- Songwriter: The Rev
- Producer: Avenged Sevenfold

Avenged Sevenfold singles chronology
"Almost Easy" (2007)	"Afterlife" (2008)	"Dear God" (2008)

"Afterlife" is a song by American heavy metal band Avenged Sevenfold. The song is released as the third single from their self-titled album. The song itself features a string orchestra and was written by the band's drummer, The Rev. The single and music video were released in early 2008. The song is one of the band's most performed live, and is a fan favorite. The song was included in the second Track Pack DLC released for Rock Band.

== Music video ==
The music video, which released on March 12, 2008, consists of the band performing on a small stage. There are also clips of M. Shadows running shirtless, Zacky Vengeance dancing with a woman, Synyster Gates holding a skull in a sea of lit candles, The Rev lying down with a Spider on his face, and Johnny Christ holding a flock of doves which he sends flying off all at once at the end of the video. The music video was directed by Wayne Isham, who has shot videos for bands like Bon Jovi, Judas Priest and Mötley Crüe.

In the album version, there is a string section in the intro and later in the song, both of which are cut out of the video, along with the bridge of the song, which features The Rev's vocals.

== Music and lyrics ==
The song features an orchestral string arrangement, and has been stylistically categorized as symphonic metal. The main riff is characterized by its "chugging groove," and according to Bobby Oliver of Alternative Press Magazine, it is "one of many across their discography that could be Guns N’ Roses outtakes." The song contains an extended guitar solo that has been described as "piercing."

According to Zacky Vengeance, the song is about a man who dies early and finds himself in heaven. Upon entering, he realizes that he has too many things to do and fix on Earth.

== Commercial performance ==
The song stayed on the UK Rock and Metal chart throughout most of 2008, and would peak at number 3. Although overall the song didn't do as well on charts as "Almost Easy" (nor is it certified by the RIAA), it has beaten all others from the album in terms of digital streams.

== Other appearances ==
The song is available as downloadable content for Rock Band and Guitar Hero 5, and is featured in the video game NHL 09. It was released for Rocksmith on October 30, 2012. The song is also available on the game Rock Band Track Pack: Volume 2.

An alternate version of the song is included on the compilation album Diamonds in the Rough, released on September 16, 2008. The alternate version has a prominent string section through the whole duration of the song, as well as a different bridge in comparison with the original song. A live performance of the song was featured on the live album Live in the LBC.

== Accolades ==
Accolades for "Afterlife"
Publication	Accolade	Rank
Kerrang!	The 20 greatest Avenged Sevenfold songs – ranked	9
Louder Sound	The 20 best Avenged Sevenfold songs ever	12
Classic Rock History	Top 10 Avenged Sevenfold Songs	4
Return of Rock	Avenged Sevenfold Songs Ranked	1
Return of Rock	Avenged Sevenfold Self Titled Album Songs Ranked	1

== Track listing ==
All songs credited to Avenged Sevenfold. Actual songwriters listed below.

Single
No.	Title	Writer(s)	Length
1.	"Afterlife"	James Sullivan	5:53
2.	"Critical Acclaim" (live in Hollywood)	Matthew Sanders; Sullivan; Zachary Baker; Brian Haner Jr.; Jonathan Seward	5:22

Digital download EP
No.	Title	Writer(s)	Length
1.	"Afterlife"	James Sullivan	5:53
2.	"Critical Acclaim" (live in Hollywood)	Matthew Sanders; Sullivan; Zachary Baker; Brian Haner Jr.; Jonathan Seward	5:22
3.	"Beast and the Harlot" (live in Hollywood)	Sanders; Haner	5:54

Promo single
No.	Title	Writer(s)	Length
1.	"Afterlife" (radio edit)	Sullivan	4:02

== Personnel ==
Avenged Sevenfold

- M. Shadows – lead vocals
- Zacky Vengeance – rhythm guitar, backing vocals
- The Rev – drums, backing vocals, co-lead vocals, piano
- Synyster Gates – lead guitar, backing vocals
- Johnny Christ – bass, backing vocals

Session musicians

- Miles Mosley – upright bass
- Cameron Stone – cello
- Caroline Campbell – violin
- Neel Hammond – violin
- Andrew Duckles – viola

Production

- Avenged Sevenfold – production
- Fred Archambault – engineering
- Dave Schiffman – engineering
- Clifton Allen – assistant engineering
- Chris Steffen – assistant engineering
- Robert DeLong – assistant engineering
- Aaron Walk – assistant engineering
- Mike Scielzi – assistant engineering
- Josh Wilbur – assistant engineering
- Andy Wallace – mixing
- Brian Gardner – mastering
- Mike Fasano – drum technician
- Walter Rice – guitar technician
- Daniel McLaughlin – 'Fan Producer for a Day' (MVI)
- Christopher Guinn – 'Fan Producer for a Day' (MVI)

== Charts ==
=== Weekly charts ===
Weekly chart performance for "Afterlife"
Chart (2008)	Peak position
UK Singles (Official Charts)	197
UK Rock & Metal (Official Charts)	3
US Alternative Airplay (Billboard)	20
US Mainstream Rock Airplay (Billboard)	11

=== Year-end charts ===
Year-end chart performance for "Afterlife"
Chart (2008)	Position
US Mainstream Rock Songs (Billboard)	30

== Certifications ==
Certifications for "Afterlife"
Region	Certification	Certified units/sales
New Zealand (RMNZ)	Gold	15,000^{‡}
United Kingdom (BPI)	Silver	200,000^{‡}
^{‡} Sales+streaming figures based on certification alone.
