= Avenged Sevenfold (album) =

Studio album by Avenged Sevenfold
- Released: October 30, 2007
- Recorded: Mid-2007
- Studios: Sunset Sound Studios (Los Angeles); Eldorado (Burbank); Capitol (Hollywood)
- Genre: Heavy metal
- Length: 53:07
- Labels: Warner Bros.; Hopeless
- Producer: Avenged Sevenfold

Avenged Sevenfold chronology
City of Evil (2005)	Avenged Sevenfold (2007)	Live in the LBC & Diamonds in the Rough (2008)

Singles from Avenged Sevenfold
- 1. "Critical Acclaim" Released: August 17, 2007; 2. "Almost Easy" Released: September 18, 2007; 3. "Afterlife" Released: January 29, 2008; 4. "Dear God" Released: June 15, 2008; 5. "Scream" Released: October 28, 2008

Avenged Sevenfold is the fourth studio album by American heavy metal band Avenged Sevenfold, released on October 30, 2007, through Warner Bros. and Hopeless Records. Recorded in the middle of 2007, it was the band's first studio album to be solely self-produced. It was their final studio album to feature The Rev performing on drums before his death during production of their follow-up album, Nightmare (2010). It was also their final album to feature the involvement of Hopeless. Originally slated for an October 16 release, it was delayed by two weeks in order to provide more time to complete bonus material and production for the record.

Although critical reception to the album was mixed compared to previous releases, Avenged Sevenfold was a commercial success, debuting at number 4 on the Billboard 200, and has been a popular album among fans. Additionally, it won the Kerrang! Award for Best Album in 2008 and was later included in Kerrang!'s "666 Albums You Must Hear Before You Die". As of 2014, it has sold over 960,161 copies in the United States and 152,123 copies in the United Kingdom; it has been certified platinum by the Recording Industry Association of America (RIAA) in the United States and gold by the British Phonographic Industry (BPI) in the United Kingdom. The band supported the album with a tour, beginning a day before the release of the album and ending in August 2009.

== Background ==
The album's tempo is drastically slower than the speed metal and power metal stylings of City of Evil. M. Shadows explained that the band's decision was the result of experiences witnessing bands with slower tempos than them come across better in a live setting. He said: "The reason Ozzfest was weird was because we were trying to get to a new audience, and when they came to us for that tour, they said, "We want you to play before Disturbed, and it'd be you, Disturbed, and System of a Down." But you got to sound real good when you're playing these big places, these amphitheaters, and on that record we're just playing a million miles a minute and it's just getting lost. And then you have Disturbed come on and it's just [hums slow churning riff], and we're like, Dude, this projects! Like, this groove. And then System of a Down come on, and they're kind of back and forth but they have a lot of songs that are just real big. And we're just like, Dude, we're like a speed-metal band going on with these guys. Like, no one's going to get this. And so we were kind of bummed on that and then we got offered the Metallica tour, and we did the same thing, going out in an arena with 70, 80,000 people a night in Europe. And Metallica's playing fucking "Sad But True," "The Unforgiven" or "Enter Sandman," songs that just have that power that cuts through. So that's where we got the concept of making a record that, sonically, is just more open. That's where songs like "Critical Acclaim" and "Scream" and "Afterlife," "Almost Easy," come from. They're all mid-tempo, but they've got big riffs that have a lot of space in them, and that's why we wrote a record like that. It was a reaction to all the touring."

Avenged Sevenfold revealed the track listing for the album on their YouTube profile on August 9, 2007, as well as their text messaging service, A7X Mobile. The band also posted a teaser on a recent YouTube blog featuring an excerpt of vocalist M. Shadows screaming in the studio.

"Critical Acclaim" was the first single from the album. A 2-minute and 15-seconds teaser was posted on the band's MySpace to tide fans over until the iTunes release date, but on August 20, 2007, Avenged Sevenfold uploaded the full version on their MySpace. The full song was released on iTunes on August 28, 2007.

In the weeks leading up to the album's release, a series of ten video clips, called "webisodes", were recorded featuring "Wolfie the Fox". The first webisode was released on August 24, 2007; a 3:41 clip that was posted on the band's YouTube channel. The clip consists of a pre-recorded phone message from "Wolfie the Fox" and a few scenes of their process of making "Critical Acclaim". Each of the subsequent webisodes was similar in content. The clips featured a short mock-interview between M. Shadows and Wolfie the Fox, various band members during the making of various tracks for Avenged Sevenfold, and other background videos. About eleven days before the album's release, the Wolfie Trailer was posted on YouTube. In it, Wolfie sings "Critical Acclaim" and talks about the MVI version of the new album. The webisodes can all be viewed on the band's Myspace and YouTube pages.

By September 9, 2007, news leaked of the completion of a music video for the song "Almost Easy". It was directed by P.R. Brown, known for his collaborations with Mötley Crüe and Marilyn Manson, among many others. On September 12, 2007, the release date of the single "Almost Easy" was announced and was released six days later on September 18 to purchase via digital download.

The month of October was a busy one for the upcoming album. On October 3, Kerrang! released an article in which M. Shadows and Synyster Gates were interviewed about the new album. This day also saw the release of a live performance of "Almost Easy" at the Warped Tour 2007. Originally the band intended to release this footage if viewers watched the official music video for the track on YouTube 150,000 times. Though the goal fell short at 120,000 the band still released the footage. Another live video, featuring the third track "Scream" performed in Liverpool, England, was posted on YouTube on October 11. The song was also heard during a commercial for the Scream Awards on Spike TV. M. Shadows can clearly be heard singing, "You know I make you wanna scream," which is an excerpt from the chorus. "Scream" was performed live at the 2007 Spike TV Scream Awards on October 23. Also, LoveLine played the radio premiere of "Afterlife" and "Almost Easy", which was guest hosted by M. Shadows and The Rev. Three days before, the Keyclub revealed an animated music video for "A Little Piece of Heaven".

To promote their new album, Avenged Sevenfold started their US tour on October 29, headlining in Los Angeles at The Wiltern. Their opening acts were Black Tide and Operator.

On October 30, 2007, Avenged Sevenfold was released in stores worldwide.

On October 31, 2008, Avenged Sevenfold mentioned that fans of the band were eligible to make their own music video for the song "Scream". The video had to be submitted to YouTube before November 30, 2008. The winner and five runners-up of the contest were announced on December 15, 2008. The winner received a new MacBook Air computer that came with Avenged Sevenfold videos, music, and other items from the band. The winning video was also featured on the Avenged Sevenfold website, MySpace page, YouTube account, and Facebook account. The five runners-up in this contest received a copy of the DVD and CD Live in the LBC & Diamonds in the Rough, signed by the members of the band; in addition, a merchandise pack was also rewarded to these runners-up.

== Songs ==
"Critical Acclaim" was the first song written for the album, and was also released as the lead single. The song is about people in the United States who criticize each other, but never do anything to make a change. It also features lyrics about people not appreciating what soldiers do for them. The song received negative attention due to the perceived political nature of the lyrics, though bassist Johnny Christ explained that it was "more of a human thing", and not a criticism of one group of people.

"Almost Easy" was released as the second single from the album. The song was written by drummer The Rev. It was originally supposed to appear in the 2007 Transformers film, but it wasn't finished in time. It was later featured in the film's sequel, Revenge of the Fallen. The song has been certified platinum by the RIAA. The USC Trojans Marching Band performed the song "Almost Easy" at the Rose Bowl halftime show on January 1, 2009.

"Scream" is the third song on the record, and was released as the fifth and final single from the album in October 2008. The song opens with a scream by Valary Sanders, who is singer M. Shadows' wife (and Synyster Gates' sister-in-law).

"Afterlife" is about a man who dies suddenly, and finds himself in heaven. Although he enjoys the peace, he decides he needs to escape, because he isn't ready to die. The song didn't do as well on charts as "Almost Easy", but, although it hasn't been certified by the RIAA, the song has beaten all others from the album in terms of digital streams.

"Gunslinger" is about a soldier missing his family and home during a war. The song moves from a country ballad into a more regular hard rock song.

"Unbound (The Wild Ride)" is the sixth track on the album. It features a children's choir singing the outro. The song is singer M. Shadows least favorite Avenged Sevenfold song.

"Dear God" was the fourth single and a notable deviation from the band's usual heavy metal style, taking on more of a country feel. Johnny Christ has stated that the inspiration for the song came from the band's friendship with country act Big & Rich. Their influence can be heard in the background vocals of MuzikMafia member Shanna Crooks.

== Musical style ==
The album represents a further move away from the metalcore of the band's early work, and closer to traditional heavy metal and hard rock, as opposed to the faster tempos of City of Evil. The album also touches upon other genres including country music, straight-ahead rock, and symphonic rock. The band worked with brass and string sections on "A Little Piece of Heaven", an avant-garde metal song, in which horns and orchestral strings replaced the band's lead and rhythm guitars. The album features The Rev performing co-lead vocals on the songs "Critical Acclaim", "Scream", "Afterlife", "Lost", and "A Little Piece of Heaven". He also provides vocals on "Almost Easy" and "Brompton Cocktail", as well as the bonus track "Crossroads" (which was later included on Diamonds in the Rough, a compilation of this album's outtakes).

== Reception ==
Professional ratings
Aggregate scores
Source	Rating
Metacritic	56/100
Review scores
Source	Rating
AllMusic	3/5 stars
The A.V. Club	B
Blender	3/5 stars
Entertainment Weekly	B
IGN	7.9/10
Rolling Stone	2.5/5 stars
Sputnikmusic	1.0/5

Upon release, Avenged Sevenfold was met with mixed reviews. Metacritic accumulated an average score of 56 out of 100 based on thirteen reviews on the website.

Jason Lymangrover of AllMusic had given the album a rating of three stars out of five and wrote "While their willingness to experiment is admirable, despite the fact that they've gone overboard with their overdubs, the overabundance of studio polish leaves one to wonder if it's not because the songs just aren't as strong this time around". A more positive review came from Andrew Earles of The A.V. Club who commented "The catchy Stone Temple Pilots vibe of 'Scream' is enough to put the band back on the charts, but that could happen with more than half of this album...And it probably will". He graded the album a B.

The album wasn't without its more hostile responses. A much more negative review came from Dave de Sylvia of Sputnikmusic summarizing "Avenged Sevenfold resemble a poor man's Hardcore Superstar" and rated the album one out of five. Andrew Blackie of PopMatters rated the album two out of ten and dismissed it as being "Unoriginal, overlong even at a ten track setlist, and riddled with banality..." He even went far enough to add "...the disc is even being released the day before Halloween, could it get more corny?"

Despite the mixed reaction, the album won a Kerrang! Award for Best Album in 2008. In a fan poll conducted by Revolver, the album was ranked as the best album in Avenged Sevenfold's discography.

=== Accolades ===
Year	Nominated work	Award	Result
2008	Avenged Sevenfold	Kerrang! Awards: Album of the Year	Won

== Track listing ==
All songs credited to Avenged Sevenfold. Actual songwriters listed below.

Standard edition
No.	Title	Writer(s)	Length
1.	"Critical Acclaim"	Matthew Sanders; James Sullivan; Zachary Baker; Brian Haner Jr.; Jonathan Seward	5:16
2.	"Almost Easy"	Sullivan	3:55
3.	"Scream"	Sanders; Haner; Baker	4:49
4.	"Afterlife"	Sullivan	5:53
5.	"Gunslinger"	Sanders; Haner	4:12
6.	"Unbound (The Wild Ride)"	Sanders; Haner; Baker	5:12
7.	"Brompton Cocktail"	Sullivan; Sanders	4:13
8.	"Lost"	Haner; Sanders	5:02
9.	"A Little Piece of Heaven"	Sullivan	8:01
10.	"Dear God"	Sanders; Haner; Seward	6:34
Total length:			53:07

Japanese edition bonus track
No.	Title	Writer(s)	Length
11.	"Almost Easy" (Live from Warped Tour 2007)	Sullivan	4:23
Total length:			57:21

iTunes edition bonus tracks
No.	Title	Writer(s)	Length
11.	"Almost Easy" (Jam-along Version)	Sullivan	3:55
12.	"Bat Country" (Live at Hammerstein Ballroom)	Sanders; Haner; Sullivan	6:04
13.	"Crossroads" (B-side; MVI exclusive)		4:30
Total length:			67:28

== Personnel ==
All credits adapted from the album's liner notes.

Avenged Sevenfold

- M. Shadows – vocals
- Zacky Vengeance – rhythm guitar, backing vocals; acoustic guitar (10)
- The Rev – drums, percussion, piano, backing vocals; co-lead vocals (1, 3, 4, 8, 9)
- Synyster Gates – lead guitar, backing vocals
- Johnny Christ – bass, backing vocals

Session musicians

- Jay E – programming (1, 3)
- Jamie Muhoberac – piano and organ (1, 6, 8, 9)
- Greg Kusten – piano (2)
- Miles Mosley – upright bass (4, 7, 9)
- Cameron Stone – cello (4, 7, 9)
- Caroline Campbell – violin (4, 7, 9)
- Neel Hammond – violin (4, 7, 9)
- Andrew Duckles – viola (4, 7, 9)
- Zander Ayeroff – backing vocals (6)
- Annmarie Rizzo – backing vocals (6)
- Lenny Castro – percussion (7)
- Beth Andersen – choir (6, 9)
- Monique Donnelly – choir (6, 9)
- Rob Giles – choir (6, 9)
- Debbie Hall – choir (6, 9)
- Scottie Haskell – choir (6, 9)
- Luana Jackman – choir (6, 9)
- Bob Joyce – choir (6, 9)
- Rock Logan – choir (6, 9)
- Susie Stevens Logan – choir (6, 9)
- Arnold McCuller – choir (6, 9)
- Gabriel Mann – choir (6, 9)
- Ed Zajack – choir (6, 9)
- Bill Liston – alto sax and clarinet (9)
- Brandon Fields – alto sax (9)
- Rusty Higgins – clarinet and tenor sax (9)
- Dave Boruff – tenor sax (9)
- Joel Peskin – bari sax (9)
- Wayne Bergeron – trumpet (9)
- Dan Foreno – trumpet (9)
- Bruce Fowler – trombone (9)
- Alex Iies – trombone (9)
- Juliette Commagere – additional vocals (9)
- Greg Leisz – lap steel guitar, pedal steel guitar, banjo (5, 10)
- Shanna Crooks – additional vocals (5, 10)
- Jaime Ochoa – additional vocals (1)
- Valary Sanders – scream (3)

Production

- Avenged Sevenfold – producer
- Fred Archambault – engineer
- Dave Schiffman – engineer
- Clifton Allen – assistant engineer
- Chris Steffen – assistant engineer
- Robert DeLong – assistant engineer
- Aaron Walk – assistant engineer
- Mike Scielzi – assistant engineer
- Josh Wilbur – assistant engineer
- Andy Wallace – mixer
- Brian Gardner – mastering
- Mike Fasano – drum tech
- Walter Rice – guitar tech
- Daniel McLaughlin – fan producer for a day (MVI)
- Christopher Guinn – fan producer for a day (MVI)

== Charts ==
=== Weekly charts ===
Chart (2007)	Peak position
Australian Albums (ARIA)	37
Canadian Albums (Billboard)	6
Irish Albums (IRMA)	41
Japanese Albums (Oricon)	12
Scottish Albums (Official Charts)	28
UK Albums (Official Charts)	24
US Billboard 200	4
US Top Alternative Albums (Billboard)	1
US Top Hard Rock Albums (Billboard)	1
US Top Rock Albums (Billboard)	1

=== Year-end charts ===
Chart (2008)	Position
US Billboard 200	117

=== Singles ===
Year	Title	Chart positions				
Year	Title	US	US Mainstream Rock	US Modern Rock	UK	UK Rock
2007	"Critical Acclaim"	—	—	—	—	—
2007	"Almost Easy"	106	3	6	67	1
2008	"Afterlife"	—	11	20	197	1
2008	"Dear God"	—	—	—	—	3
2008	"Scream"	—	9	26	—	—

== Certifications ==
Region	Certification	Certified units/sales
New Zealand (RMNZ)	Gold	7,500^{‡}
United Kingdom (BPI)	Gold	100,000^{^}
United States (RIAA)	Platinum	1,000,000^{‡}
^{^} Shipments figures based on certification alone.^{‡} Sales+streaming figures based on certification alone.
