= Avenged Sevenfold =

American heavy metal band

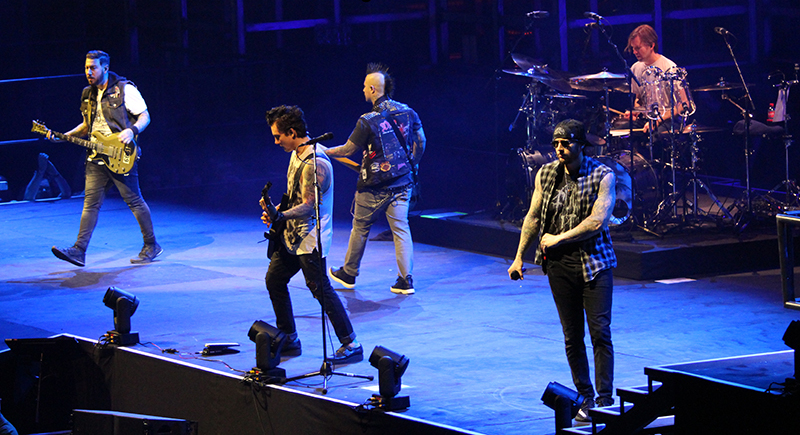
- Avenged Sevenfold on stage in Dublin, Ireland, 2017

Background information
- Origin: Huntington Beach, California, U.S.
- Genres: Heavy metal; progressive metal; alternative metal; hard rock; metalcore (early)
- Works: Avenged Sevenfold discography
- Years active: 1999–present
- Labels: Good Life; Hopeless; Warner; Capitol
- Spinoffs: Pinkly Smooth
- Members: M. Shadows; Zacky Vengeance; Synyster Gates; Johnny Christ; Brooks Wackerman
- Past members: Matt Wendt; Justin Sane; Dameon Ash; The Rev; Arin Ilejay
- Website: avengedsevenfold.com

Avenged Sevenfold (abbreviated as A7X) is an American heavy metal band from Huntington Beach, California, formed in 1999. The band's current lineup consists of vocalist M. Shadows, guitarists Zacky Vengeance and Synyster Gates, bassist Johnny Christ and drummer Brooks Wackerman.

Avenged Sevenfold are known for their diverse rock sound and dramatic imagery in album covers and merchandise. The band emerged with a metalcore sound on their debut album Sounding the Seventh Trumpet; they largely continued this sound through their second album Waking the Fallen. The band's style had evolved by their third album and first major label release, City of Evil, into a more traditional heavy metal style. The band continued to explore new sounds with its self-titled release and enjoyed continued mainstream success before their founding drummer, Jimmy "The Rev" Sullivan, died in 2009. Despite his death, Avenged Sevenfold continued on with the help of Dream Theater member Mike Portnoy, and released and toured in support of their fifth album Nightmare in 2010, which debuted atop the Billboard 200, their first number one debut.

In 2011, drummer Arin Ilejay joined the band on tours and recording. The band's sixth studio album Hail to the King, which was released in 2013, marked the only Avenged Sevenfold album featuring Ilejay. It would feature a heavy metal and hard rock style, with it being written as a tribute to their influences. Hail to the King charted as number 1 on the Billboard 200, the UK Albums chart, as well as the Finnish, Brazilian, Canadian, and Irish charts. Ilejay left the band in late 2014 and was replaced by former Bad Religion drummer Brooks Wackerman, but the lineup change was not announced to the public until 2015. The band then surprise-released their seventh studio album The Stage in October 2016, which debuted as number 4 on the Billboard 200 chart in the US. The Stage is their first conceptual album and marked another stylistic change for the band, moving towards a progressive metal sound. The band released their eighth studio album, Life Is But a Dream..., a highly experimental record, in June 2023.

To date, Avenged Sevenfold have released eight studio albums, one live album/DVD, two compilation albums and eighteen singles and have sold over 8 million albums worldwide, and their records have received numerous certification awards, including five platinum album awards from their home country's institution (RIAA). They have also created four original songs for the Call of Duty: Black Ops series, all of which were compiled together in the 2018 EP Black Reign. The band were ranked No. 47 on Loudwire's list of Top 50 Metal Bands of All Time. Christina Fuoco of AllMusic called Avenged Sevenfold "one of the more successful and accessible metalcore outfits of the early 21st century." In 2016, the staff of Loudwire named them the 47th-best metal band of all time.

== History ==
=== Formation and Sounding the Seventh Trumpet (1999–2002) ===
Avenged Sevenfold was formed in 1999 in Huntington Beach, California by Matt Sanders, James Sullivan, Zachary Baker and Matt Wendt. Although they are not a religious band, Sanders came up with the name as a reference to the story of Cain and Abel from the Bible, in which the phrase 'avenged sevenfold' can be found in Genesis 4:24. All four members already had experience performing in bands, with Sanders being the vocalist and Wendt the bassist for the punk band Successful Failure, Baker playing guitar in the punk bands Society Down and MPA (short for Mad Porn Action/Addiction), and Sullivan being the drummer for the ska band Suburban Legends (formerly known as Bomb Squad).

Avenged Sevenfold's first creative output was a three-song-demo recorded in October 1999 at the A-Room Studios in Orange County, California. The band played their first show at the Walnut, California City Hall on February 11, 2000. Around this time, they were asked by Sadistic Records to contribute to two compilations, so the band recorded two new songs and released them along with the previously recorded songs on a second demo. They sent this demo to the Belgian label Good Life Recordings and were subsequently signed. Afterwards, the band participated in another two compilation albums, their label's GoodLife 4 and Novocaine Records' Scrape III compilations. Around this time, Matt Wendt left for college and Justin Meacham, the previous bassist of Suburban Legends, joined Avenged Sevenfold. In late 2000, the foursome took on their initial stage names – M. Shadows, Zacky Vengeance, Justin Sane and The Rev – and recorded their debut album, Sounding the Seventh Trumpet. In early 2001, lead guitarist and old friend Synyster Gates joined the band and they re-recorded the introductory track "To End the Rapture" for the album's lead-single/EP, Warmness on the Soul, released in April 2001. Although their debut album's release was initially planned for the same month, it was pushed back multiple times and eventually released on July 24, 2001, on Good Life Recordings.

Around August 2001, Meacham attempted suicide by drinking excessive amounts of cough syrup. This event was the reason for Avenged Sevenfold to join the Take Action Tour in 2003. During Meacham's hospitalization, he remained in poor condition and had to leave the band. In an interview, lead singer M. Shadows said of Meacham that "he perma-fried his brain and was in a mental institution for a long time, and when you have someone in your band who does that, it ruins everything that's going on all around you, and it makes you want to do something to prevent it from happening to other people." His replacement was Frank Melcom, stage name Dameon Ash, who performed with the band for the following months, but does not appear on any releases.

On January 18, 2002, Avenged Sevenfold left Good Life Recordings and signed with Hopeless Records. They re-released their debut album on March 19 and also appeared on the Hopelessly Devoted To You Vol. 4 sampler in April. The band started to receive recognition, performing with bands such as Mushroomhead and Shadows Fall. They spent the year touring in support of their debut album and participated in the Vans Warped Tour. In September, Dameon Ash left Avenged Sevenfold and their current bassist Johnny Christ joined them, completing their best known line-up.

=== Waking the Fallen and City of Evil (2003–2005) ===
Having found a new bassist, the group released their second studio album titled Waking the Fallen on Hopeless Records in August 2003. The album featured a more refined and mature sound production in comparison to their previous album. The band received profiles in Billboard and The Boston Globe, and again played on the Vans Warped and Take Action tours. Baker recalled: "We didn't care if [the bands we were playing with] were heavy-metal bands; we didn't care if they were fucking pop-punk bands; we didn't care, we were opening for everyone. And people started taking notice. You know if your band is going crazy and breaking your instruments and playing the fastest, craziest music at a pop-punk show, people take notice, whether it's good or it's bad." Shortly after the release of Waking the Fallen, Avenged Sevenfold left Hopeless Records and were officially signed to Warner Bros. Records on November 1, 2003. The band then toured Europe for the first time in its career. M. Shadows recalled, "It was everything you would imagine it to be: pure debauchery." Synyster Gates remarked: "It's unbelievable that we survived that [tour]. Really, any night could just escalate – not just because of us, but because of being in a foreign place, being out too late. There were people around you that just wouldn't stop buying you shots. One time I had 10 shots of Aftershock in my hand, and next to me was my Snakebite and black. I should've died of alcohol poisoning! By the end of that first UK tour, we were 10 pounds heavier and pretty fucked." In 2004, Avenged Sevenfold toured again on the Vans Warped Tour and recorded a video for their song "Unholy Confessions" which went into rotation on MTV2's Headbangers Ball.

City of Evil, the band's third album and major label debut, was released on June 6, 2005, and debuted at No. 30 on the Billboard 200 chart, selling over 30,000 copies in its first week of release. It utilized a more classic metal sound than Avenged Sevenfold's previous albums, which had been grouped into the metalcore genre. The album is also notable for the absence of screamed and growled vocals; M. Shadows worked with vocal coach Ron Anderson—whose clients have included Axl Rose and Chris Cornell—for months before the album's release to achieve a sound that had "grit while still having the tone". The album received positive reviews from several magazines and websites and is credited for propelling the band into international popularity.

=== Avenged Sevenfold (2006–2008) ===
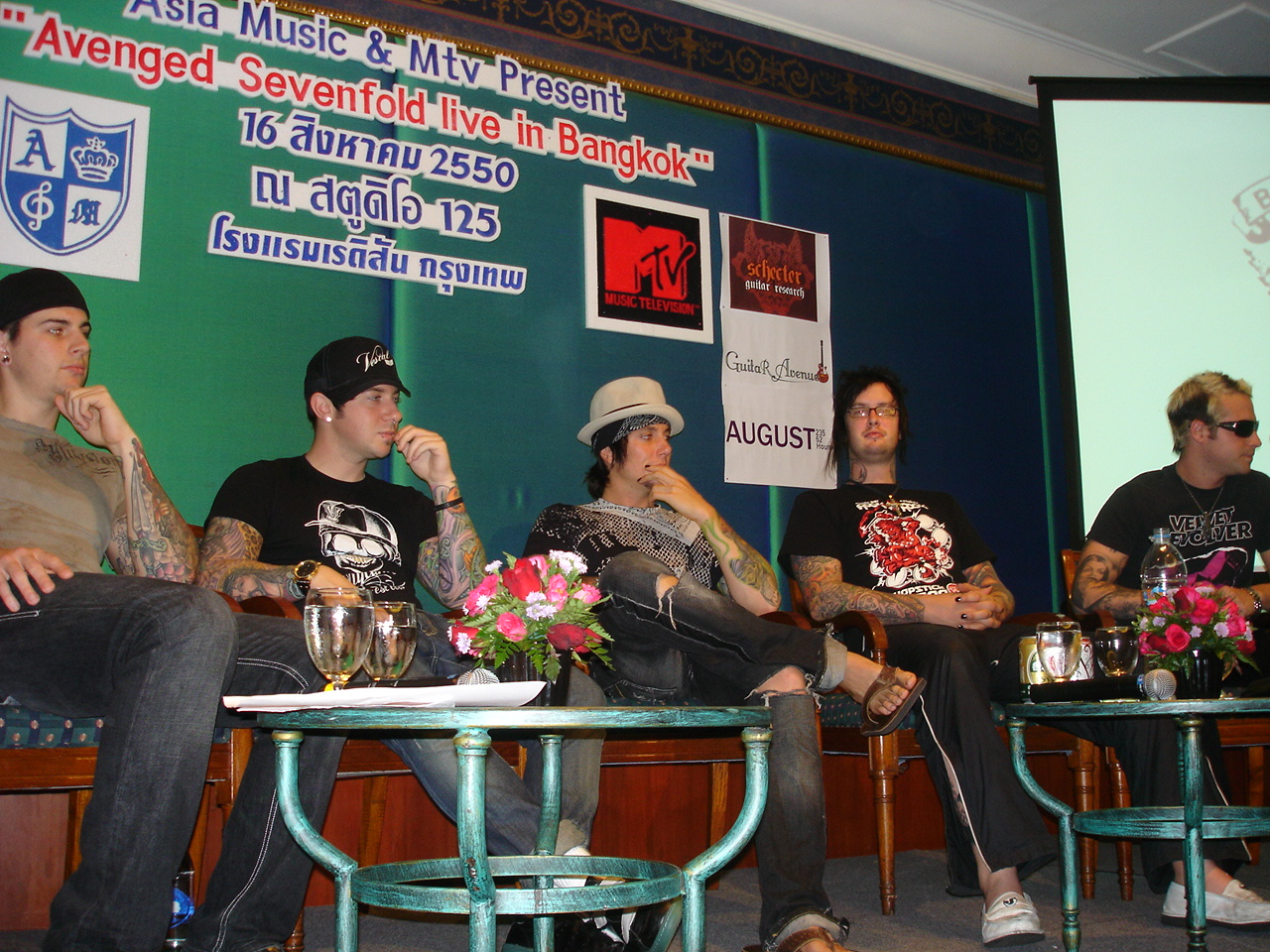
Avenged Sevenfold in 2007

After playing Ozzfest in 2006, Avenged Sevenfold memorably beat out R&B singers Rihanna and Chris Brown, Panic! at the Disco, Angels & Airwaves and James Blunt for the title of Best New Artist at the MTV Video Music Awards, thanks in part to their Fear and Loathing in Las Vegas-inspired song "Bat Country." They returned to the Vans Warped Tour, this time headlining and then continued on their own "Cities of Evil Tour." In addition, their lead single "Bat Country" reached No. 2 on the Billboard Mainstream Rock Charts, No. 6 on the Billboard Modern Rock Charts and the accompanying video made it to No. 1 on MTV's Total Request Live. Propelled by this success, the album sold well and became Avenged Sevenfold's first Gold record. It was later certified platinum in August 2009. Avenged Sevenfold was invited to join Ozzfest tour on the main stage, alongside other well known rock/heavy metal acts such as DragonForce, Lacuna Coil, Hatebreed, Disturbed and System of a Down for the first time in 2006. That same year they also completed a worldwide tour, including the US, Japan, Australia and New Zealand. After a sixteen-month promotion of City of Evil, the band announced that they were cancelling their Fall 2006 tour to record new music. In the interim, the band released their first DVD titled All Excess on July 17, 2007. All Excess, which debuted as the No. 1 DVD in the US, included live performances and backstage footage that spanned the band's eight-year career. Two tribute albums, Strung Out on Avenged Sevenfold: Bat Wings and Broken Strings and Strung Out on Avenged Sevenfold: The String Tribute were also released in October 2007.

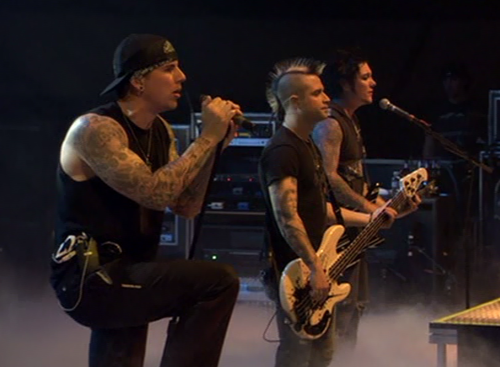
The band performing in 2008

On October 30, 2007, Avenged Sevenfold released their self-titled album, the band's fourth studio album. It debuted at No. 4 on the Billboard 200 with over 90,000 copies sold. Two singles, "Critical Acclaim" and "Almost Easy" were released prior to the album's debut. In December 2007, an animated video was made for "A Little Piece of Heaven". Due to the song's controversial subject matter, however, Warner Brothers only released it to registered MVI users over the internet. The third single, "Afterlife" and its video was released in January 2008. Their fourth single, "Dear God", was released on June 15, 2008. Although critical reception was generally mixed the self-titled album went on to sell over 500,000 copies and was awarded "Album of the Year" at the Kerrang! Awards.

Avenged Sevenfold headlined the 2008 Taste of Chaos tour with Atreyu, Bullet for My Valentine, Blessthefall and Idiot Pilot. Footage from their last show in Long Beach was used for the band's next release, Live in the LBC & Diamonds in the Rough, released on September 16, 2008. Its content includes live DVD from their performance at Long Beach, and a CD containing B-sides from Avenged Sevenfold, and other rarities, such as covers from Pantera's "Walk" and Iron Maiden's "Flash of the Blade".

=== Death of The Rev and Nightmare (2009–2011) ===
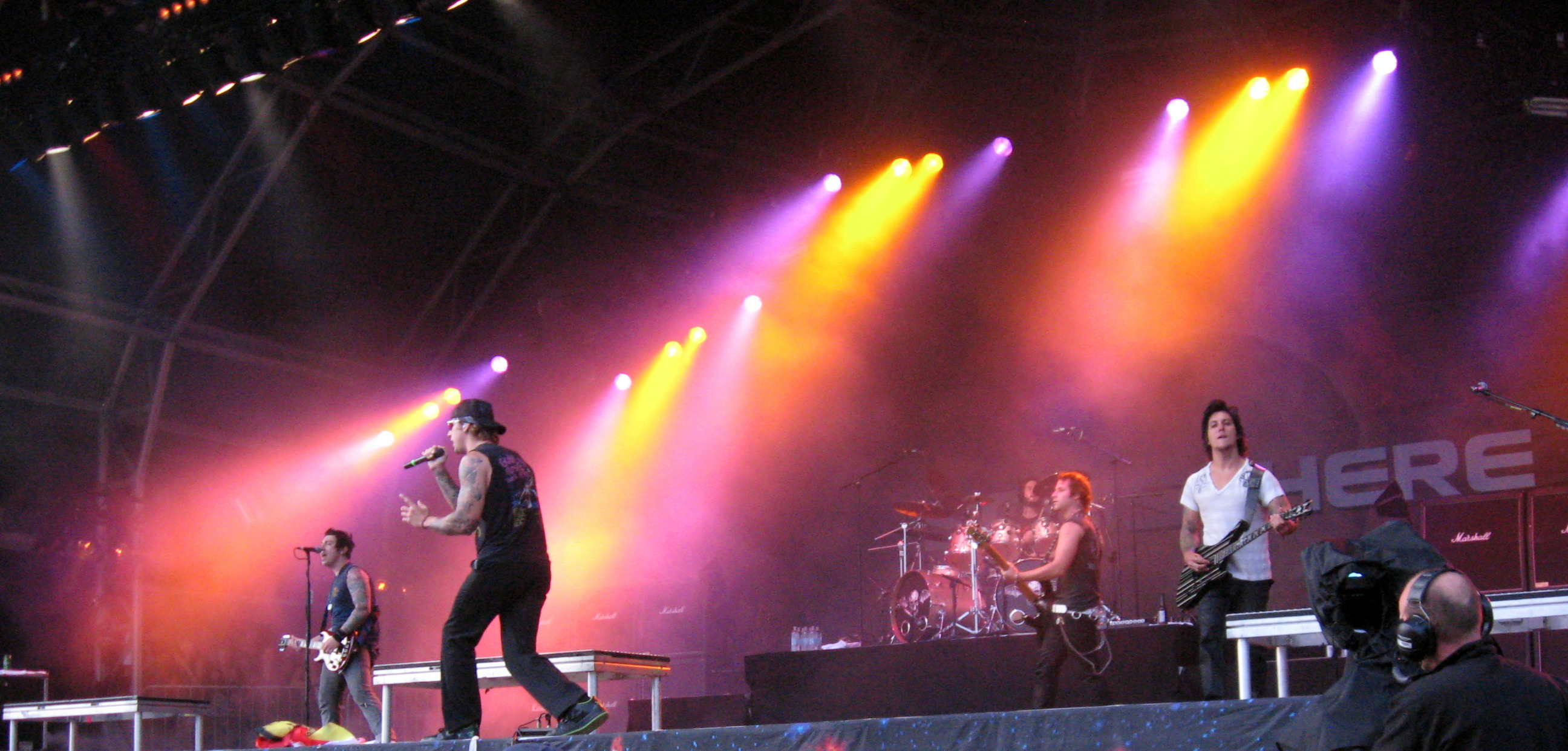
Avenged Sevenfold performing at the Sonisphere Festival on August 2, 2009. This was The Rev's final show with the band before his death.

In January 2009, M. Shadows confirmed that the band was writing the follow-up to their self-titled fourth album within the upcoming months. They also played at Rock on the Range, from May 16–17, 2009. On April 16, they performed a version of Guns N' Roses' "It's So Easy" onstage with Slash, at the Nokia Theater in Los Angeles. On December 28, 2009, the band's drummer James "The Rev" Sullivan was found dead at his home at the age of 28. The band announced his death with a statement saying: "It is with great sadness and heavy hearts that we tell you of the passing today of Jimmy 'The Rev' Sullivan. Jimmy was not only one of the world's best drummers, but more importantly he was our best friend and brother. Our thoughts and prayers go out to Jimmy's family and we hope that you will respect their privacy during this difficult time." Autopsy results were inconclusive, but on June 9, 2010, the cause of death was revealed to have been an "acute polydrug intoxication due to combined effects of oxycodone, oxymorphone, diazepam/nordiazepam and ethanol". In a statement by the band, they expressed their grief over the death of The Rev and later posted a message from Sullivan's family which expressed their gratitude to his fans for their support.

The band members admitted in a number of interviews that they considered disbanding at this point in time, however, on February 17, 2010, they stated that they had entered the studio, along with Dream Theater drummer Mike Portnoy, to drum for the album, in place of The Rev.

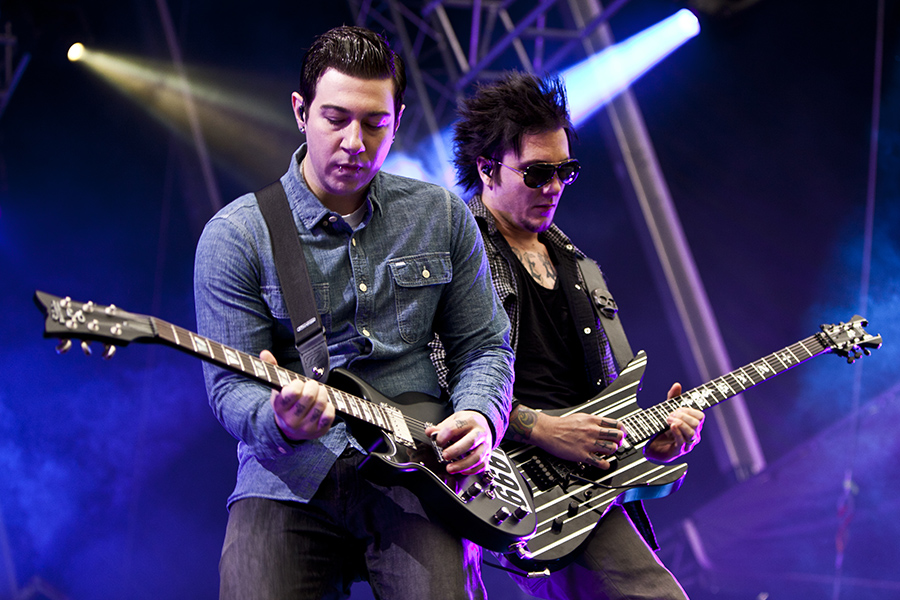
Zacky Vengeance and Synyster Gates live in Norway in 2011

The single "Nightmare" was digitally released on May 18, 2010. The song was leaked on May 6, 2010, on Amazon.com, but was removed soon after. Mixing for the album had been completed in New York City, and Nightmare was finally released on July 27, 2010, in the United States. It met with mixed to positive reviews from music critics but was well received by the fans. Nightmare beat sales projections easily, debuting at number one on the Billboard 200 with sales of 163,000 units in its first week. After finishing recording, in December, Portnoy and the band posted simultaneous statements on their websites stating that he would not be their replacement for The Rev. However, Portnoy did travel with the band overseas in December 2010 for three shows in Iraq and Kuwait sponsored by the USO. They played for U.S. Soldiers at Camp Adder, Camp Beuhring, and Balad Air Base. On January 20, 2011, Avenged Sevenfold announced via Facebook that former Confide drummer Arin Ilejay would begin touring with them that year. He was not yet considered a full-time member at this point.

Avenged Sevenfold performed at the Rock am Ring and Rock im Park festivals on June 3–5, 2011 alongside other bands such as Alter Bridge, System of a Down, and In Flames. In April 2011, the band headlined the Golden God Awards held by Metal Hammer. The same night the band won three awards for "Best Vocalist" (M. Shadows), "Epiphone Best Guitarist(s)" (Synyster Gates and Zacky Vengeance), and "Affliction's Album of The Year" for Nightmare, while Mike Portnoy won the award for "Drum Workshop's Best Drummer" for his work on the album.

Avenged Sevenfold headlined the 2011 Uproar Festival with supporting acts Three Days Grace, Seether, Bullet for My Valentine, Escape the Fate, among others. In November and December 2011, the band went on their "Buried Alive" tour with supporting acts Hollywood Undead, Asking Alexandria, and Black Veil Brides.

=== Hail to the King and Waking the Fallen: Resurrected (2012–2014) ===
On April 11, 2012, Avenged Sevenfold won the award for "Best Live Band" and "Most Dedicated Fans" at the Revolver Golden Gods awards. The band toured through Asia into April and early May, and played at the Orion Music + More, Festival on June 23 and 24 in Atlantic City, New Jersey alongside Metallica and Cage the Elephant among many others.

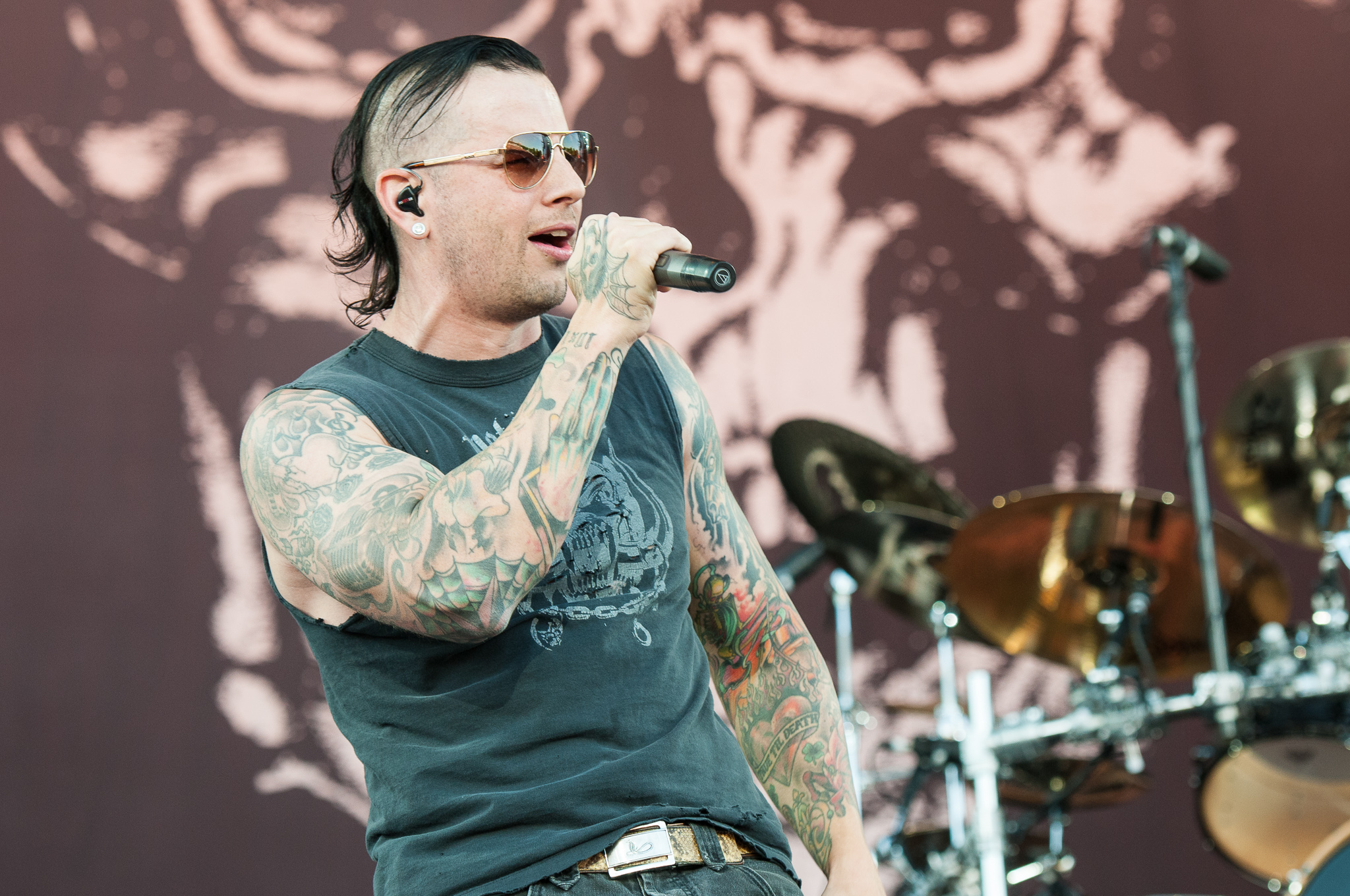
M. Shadows at Rock im Park, Germany, 2014

On September 24, 2012, Avenged Sevenfold released a new song, titled "Carry On"; it was featured in the video game Call of Duty: Black Ops II. On November 15, 2012, vocalist M. Shadows said that the band had been working on a new album since the recording of "Carry On" in August 2012. The band began recording material for the album in January 2013. The band then started streaming snippets of the album in May 2013 on their new radio app. There, Arin Ilejay was confirmed as an official band member and replacement of deceased The Rev. M. Shadows said that the album would sound more blues rock-influenced and more like classic rock/metal like Black Sabbath and Led Zeppelin.

The band was confirmed to play at the 2013 Rock in Rio festival on September 22, 2013. On May 24, 2013, the band have announced dates for their European tour with Five Finger Death Punch and Device serving as their support bands.

The album, entitled Hail to the King, was released on August 23, 2013. This is the first Avenged Sevenfold album without any musical contributions from late drummer, The Rev. The album's lead single and title track was released on July 15, 2013. Hail to the King charted as No. 1 on the US Billboard 200, the UK albums chart, as well as the Finnish, Brazilian, Canadian, and Irish charts, and was commercially and critically acclaimed. The band headlined Monster Energy's Welcome to Rockville two-day music festival in Jacksonville, Florida, April 26–27, 2014, joined by more than 25 rock acts, such as Motörhead, Rob Zombie, Chevelle, Korn, Staind, Alter Bridge, the Cult, Five Finger Death Punch, Volbeat, Black Label Society, and Seether. On June 13, the band headlined the Friday night of Download Festival 2014. The band also headlined the Mayhem Festival 2014 with Korn, Asking Alexandria, and Trivium.

In March 2014, vocalist M. Shadows revealed in an interview with Loudwire that the band had plans in the works to put something out for the overdue 10th anniversary of Waking the Fallen. Waking the Fallen: Resurrected was released August 25, 2014. The reissue charted No. 10 on the US Billboard 200.

=== Drummer change and The Stage (2015–2017) ===
In October 2014, M. Shadows confirmed that the band would begin writing their seventh album during mid-2015.

In July 2015, the band announced on their website that they would part ways with drummer Arin Ilejay, due to "creative differences". Ilejay has stated that he was not expecting his firing. He recalled: "I was totally shocked and scared out of my mind when Synyster Gates called to let me go. I was like, 'Oh my God – my wife is about to have a baby. How am I going to support my family now?" M. Shadows recounted the band's side of the situation to Ultimate Guitar, saying: "Arin got more and more distanced as time went on. It's kind of like everyone goes through their honeymoon period and it's all great, but then you start realizing that we're four guys that have a way we do things and then there's someone else that just doesn't really fit into that at all. And as nice of a guy as he is, there were just a bunch of things that didn't represent us at all, and you can't have that, especially when we've worked for so long and so hard at what we do. And the last thing we care about is our public perception of what we should do with our lives."

Although Ilejay was fired in July 2015, his dismissal and replacement had reportedly been planned as early as mid-2014. In October 2015, the band announced on their website that they had been working with a new drummer for over a year, making sure that it was a good fit before making sudden changes. On October 21, in an interview with Kerrang! magazine, guitarist Zacky Vengeance revealed that the band had been working on the new album for the past couple of months and that a couple of songs had already been completely written. On November 4, 2015, the band announced that Brooks Wackerman would replace Arin Ilejay as the drummer for Avenged Sevenfold. In an interview with Kerrang! magazine on December 3, guitarist Zacky Vengeance said that the new album went in all sorts of aggressive and melodic directions and described it as very "aggro".

On January 14, 2016, Billboard reported that Avenged Sevenfold had been sued by Warner Bros. for trying to leave the label. The band later released a statement clarifying that they wanted to leave because a majority of the executives who helped sign the band to Warner Bros were no longer at the label. They also revealed that the band was going to be entering the studio to record their new album very soon, intending to release it later in 2016. On March 31, the band posted a teaser of their upcoming album on their website.

On August 18, 2016, the band performed a free live show for 1500 people in Minnesota, marking it the first live performance with new drummer Brooks Wackerman. The band was announced as support for Metallica with Volbeat in the U.S. Bank Stadium on August 20, 2016, making it the first ever rock show in the stadium. The band was announced as a headliner of Monster Energy Rock Allegiance 2016, along with Alice in Chains, Slayer, The Offspring, Breaking Benjamin and others. Avenged Sevenfold also performed on "Louder Than Life" festival as headliners on October 1, with Slipknot, Slayer, Disturbed, Korn and other artists. On June 21, the band announced a U.S. Fall tour with Volbeat, Killswitch Engage, and Avatar. The band also announced a UK tour for January 2017 with Disturbed and In Flames. Avenged Sevenfold was announced as a headliner of 2016 edition of Knotfest Mexico. The band also announced the European Tour for February and March 2017 along with Disturbed and Chevelle.

On October 3, 2016, the band's logo Deathbat started appearing as a projection in London. After that, Deathbat also started appearing in Berlin, Toronto and Paris, indicating a release of the new album. On October 12, Chris Jericho posted an Instagram photo of the Deathbat logo with a date 12/9/16 underneath it. He then revealed the supposed title of the album, Voltaic Oceans, It was later revealed that the new album would actually be called The Stage, a concept album about artificial intelligence, which was released on October 28, 2016, via Capitol Records. The album was released to generally favorable reviews, and the band decided to make a unique stage production for it, hiring Cirque du Soleil directors for its making. In an interview with Valentino Petrarca from The Aquarian, the band dove into their choice to make their own AI model for the album campaign. They had to manually input all the answers.

Avenged Sevenfold was announced as the main support act on Metallica's WorldWired 2017 stadium summer tour in the US and Canada, alongside Volbeat and Gojira. The band also announced a series of 2017 US headlining summer shows of The Stage World Tour, with Volbeat, Motionless in White, and A Day to Remember as special guests across various dates.

On December 22, 2017, the band released a deluxe edition of The Stage that included one new original track, six cover songs, and four live tracks from their European tour earlier that year.

In a December 2017 interview with Billboard, M. Shadows revealed that the band are planning "a big US summer 2018 tour", and that the band would start working on the follow-up to The Stage in late 2018. End of the World tour with Prophets of Rage was later announced for summer 2018. The band was also announced as one of the headliners of 2018's Rock on the Range and Download Festival, in addition to appearing at Hellfest, Graspop Metal Meeting, Rock am Ring and Rock im Park the same year. Due to a blood blister forming in M. Shadows' throat, the band cancelled remaining dates from their summer tour with Prophets of Rage.

Avenged Sevenfold was nominated at 60th Annual Grammy Awards in "Best Rock Song" category for The Stage.

The band released a single titled "Mad Hatter" in September 2018, which was made specifically for the video game Call of Duty: Black Ops 4. It would later be a part of the Black Reign EP released later that month, which comprises all four of the songs Avenged Sevenfold made for the Call of Duty franchise.

=== Life Is But a Dream... (2018–present) ===
In a December 2017 interview with Billboard, M. Shadows revealed that the band are planning "a big US summer 2018 tour", and that the band would start working on the follow-up to The Stage in late 2018. Bassist Johnny Christ in a May 2018 interview confirmed that the band is currently getting ideas and writing in their own studios to start the next record in September or October 2018.

In September 2018, Synyster Gates revealed in an interview with Loudwire that the band has started working on their eighth studio album, saying "It's still early on, but we're working on a bunch of stuff". In March 2019, Zacky Vengeance stated the band would take the rest of the year off tour to concentrate on the upcoming album, saying the band is really focused on the new material. In January 2020, Avenged Sevenfold released "Set Me Free", an unreleased song recorded during the Hail to the King recording sessions. They also announced that the song would be included in a remastered re-release of Live in the LBC & Diamonds in the Rough, released on March 6. A limited edition clear vinyl of Diamonds in the Rough was also released.

On March 14, 2023, after several days of teaser videos, the band released the first single, "Nobody", along with a music video. At the same time, they officially announced that their eighth studio album, Life Is But a Dream..., was set for release on June 2, 2023 while also revealed the album cover and the track list.

On December 5, 2025, the band released a new non-album single, "Magic". It was made as a tie-in to Call of Duty: Black Ops 7's Season 1 patch.

The band started a two-month tour with Good Charlotte in July 2026. On July 23, 2026, the band surprise-released a four-track electronic EP, Statica. It was later revealed that the EP served as a prelude to a self-titled full-length album, albeit under the side project name also titled Statica. The members of Avenged Sevenfold performed as Statica, while remaining backstage, during their summer 2026 tour (as the opening band for Good Charlotte and Avenged Sevenfold).

== Artistry ==
=== Musical style and influences ===
Avenged Sevenfold's musical style has consistently evolved throughout the duration of the band's career. As a result, the band has been categorized under several genres of heavy and extreme music, primarily heavy metal, alternative metal, hard rock, and progressive metal (most notably in their album The Stage). Members of the band cite Hot Water Music, Saves the Day, Alice in Chains, Faith no More, Travis Scott, Kanye West, In Flames, Metallica, Iron Maiden, Megadeth, Slayer, Mr. Bungle, Elton John, Leonard Cohen, At the Gates, Helloween, Dream Theater, Pennywise, NOFX, Pantera, Def Leppard, Guns N' Roses, the Beatles, Anthrax, Testament, Black Sabbath, Led Zeppelin, and the Rolling Stones as influences.

The band's initial style in their first two albums was primarily categorized as metalcore, which according to Johnny Loftus of AllMusic, also "freely incorporated emo, screamo and post-hardcore elements." The band's debut album Sounding the Seventh Trumpet, while consisting largely of a hardcore or metalcore sound, has several deviations from this genre, most notably in "Warmness on the Soul", which is a piano ballad. On Waking the Fallen, the band continued the metalcore style, but incorporated more clean singing, and leaning more towards heavy metal than hardcore punk. According to M. Shadows, "We had two intentions. We wanted to be the heaviest and most melodic band at that time." In the band's DVD All Excess, producer Andrew Murdock explained this transition: "When I met the band after Sounding the Seventh Trumpet had come out before they had recorded Waking the Fallen, M. Shadows said to me 'This record is screaming. The record we want to make is going to be half-screaming half-singing. I don't want to scream anymore. And the record after that is going to be all singing'." Zacky Vengeance recalled the transition: "Waking was the first time we pushed [Shadows] to sing more. I remember at the beginning of [the album cycle], he was all screaming, and one time he was, like, kind of dicking around, singing the melody instead of screaming, and we were like, 'Dude, you have to sing that!'. And so he did, and it was incredible, you know, and then we were like, 'OK, all right, we're allowed to fucking sing. If you have a good voice, you don't have to scream just to scream.'"

On Avenged Sevenfold's third album City of Evil, the band chose to outright abandon the metalcore genre, creating a sound consistent with hard rock, heavy metal, and progressive metal. Sanders drew influence from European power metal for his vocals during this time. Avenged Sevenfold's self-titled album experiments with an even wider array of musical genres than that from City of Evil, most notably in "Dear God", which shows a country style, and "A Little Piece of Heaven", which is circled within the influence of Broadway show tunes, using primarily brass instruments and stringed orchestra to take over most of the role of the lead and rhythm guitar. Nightmare contains further deviations, including a piano ballad called "Fiction", progressive metal-oriented track "Save Me" and a heavy metal sound with extreme vocals and heavier instrumentation on "God Hates Us". The band's sixth studio album Hail to the King shows more of a classic metal sound and a riff-oriented approach. Loudwire stated that the band "went full dad rock" during this time. On their seventh album The Stage, the band explores further into progressive metal, blending it with elements of thrash metal. Their eighth album, Life Is But a Dream..., shows the band taking on more of an avant-garde metal sound.

A hallmark of the band's sound throughout its career is the dual guitar leads frequently played by Synyster Gates and Zacky Vengeance. According to the latter musician: "When it comes to our dueling guitars, we choose notes in a way that I've never heard other bands do it. I think on some of our earlier albums the harmonies are more straightforward. But as we've grown over the past three albums they've become much more defined. They intertwine in a way that isn't typical." Zacky Vengeance believes his playing style is "more raw" and Synyster Gates' style is "a little more refined". Synyster Gates' guitar playing style draws influence from jazz and classical music. He studied jazz guitar at GIT. He said: "I was in love with metal and jazz, though what I studied was more fusion-oriented, actually. And then I also did a lot of traditional, old-school bebop jazz–type stuff." His guitar solos typically employ sweep picking and shredding. Later releases saw him employing slower, more melodic solo lines. He said: "Some people will basically just shred all over everything, even a ballad. I'm glad I wasn't born with that genetic chip—the need to just wheedle-whee all over the place."

=== Lyrical themes ===
Avenged Sevenfold's lyrics often explore "emotional" topics such as long-distance relationships and grief, according to Alternative Press. They have also written about sexual intercourse and women, though lead singer M. Shadows has retroactively called some of these lyrics "cheesy". The Rev was known for writing lyrics relating to death and the afterlife, as well as "not safe for work" topics such as murder and necrophilia.

The band's lyrics occasionally incorporate Biblical imagery. When asked if Avenged Sevenfold is a Christian band, M. Shadows replied: "Absolutely not. I don't believe in those things. I try not to get into that because a lot of our fans are Christians and a lot aren't." The band's lyrics have also incorporated political themes, such as in "Critical Acclaim". In 2006, M. Shadows said: "Most people know we're kind of one of the only bands around right now that will admit that we're Republican. When we went on the Warped Tour last year — all of those bands, they're not only anti-war, they're anti-everything our country stands for. We were like, 'fuck this.' We're going to wear our America shirts." Shadows stated the band had shifted stances slightly in 2020, saying in an open letter: "I am aware that in the past Avenged has antagonized with some of our lyrics and imagery. We have also used Confederate flags in our artwork while paying tribute to artists we grew up listening to or simply trying to start controversy. I'm sure we will be called out, and rightfully so, by people reading this. No excuses. But everyone grows up at some point, and I feel grateful that we have an audience that has allowed us to evolve with them."

== Legacy ==
Avenged Sevenfold is one of the notable acts of the new wave of American heavy metal. They are considered one of the "Big Four of 2000s metal", along with Slipknot, Lamb of God and System of a Down. Loudwire called them "the archetypal metalcore-turned-dad-rock band" due to their stylistic change on Hail to the King.

Despite being classified as such by most publications, some have suggested that Avenged Sevenfold is not "metal enough". Vocalist M. Shadows said: "we play music for the sake of music, not so that we can be labeled a metal band. That's like telling us we aren't punk enough. Who cares?" Similarly, he opined: "If someone calls us a hardcore band we're just like, 'Oh... whatever. Are you gonna listen to Hatebreed or are you gonna listen to us?' Most fucking hardcore bands want to be metal bands anyway but they just can't play well enough." Eli Enis of Revolver stated that "sure, if you take Cannibal Corpse with your afternoon tea then maybe the O.C. band don't cut it."

Speaking of the band's mainstream exposure through MTV programs such as Total Request Live, Zacky Vengeance said, "you have a five-and-a-half-minute song on the radio, and you have a video with a band, fucking tattoos from head to toe, No. 1 on TRL and with guitar solos and shit. [...] And we're just kind of like, the joke's on mainstream music at that point. Here we are, fucking metal, punks, fucking who knows what kind of band, getting attention." M. Shadows recalled, "We found out that 80 percent of the kids that bought [City of Evil] were Avenged fans, and about 20 percent of them were TRL fans, like, 'I like 'Bat Country.' But I think that it got the attention of a lot of people, active-rock listeners or, you know, like, older metal people that are watching." Zacky Vengeance recalled the band's transition from underground to mainstream success: "[Ozzfest] people don't want the band that's on fucking MTV, a bunch of fucking 23-year-old assholes. They love people that they respect, and we're like, Wow, MTV and all that shit, it doesn't fucking make you a giant band, it doesn't give you longevity, and it doesn't win these fucking people over."

== Band members ==
3 Arena, Dublin on 7 January 2017

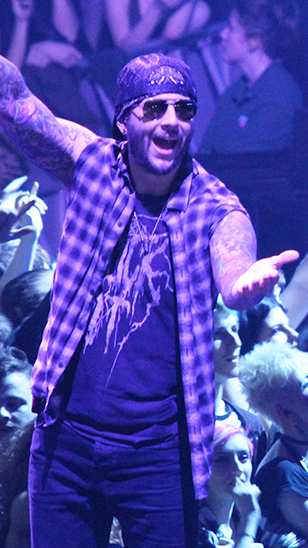
M. Shadows

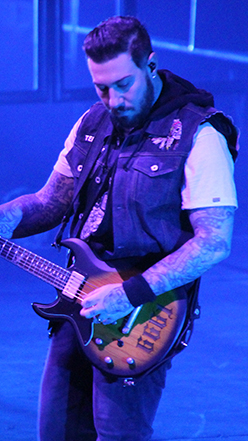
Zacky Vengeance

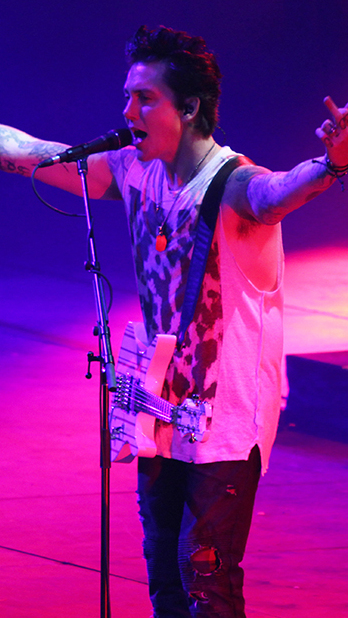
Synyster Gates

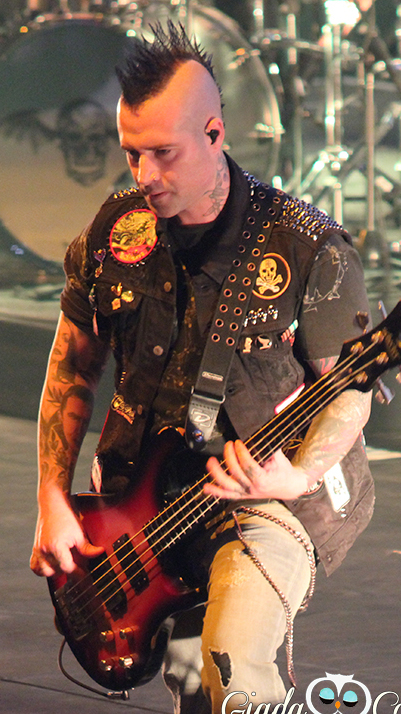
Johnny Christ

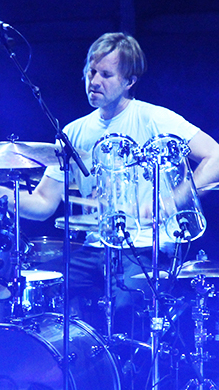
Brooks Wackerman

Current members

- M. Shadows (Matthew Sanders) – lead vocals, keyboards (1999–present), additional rhythm guitar (2000, 2016)
- Zacky Vengeance (Zachary Baker) – rhythm guitar, backing and occasional lead vocals (1999–present), lead guitar (1999–2001)
- Synyster Gates (Brian Haner Jr.) – lead guitar, keyboards, backing vocals (2001–present), lead vocals (2013–present)
- Johnny Christ (Jonathan Seward) – bass, backing vocals (2002–present)
- Brooks Wackerman – drums (2015–present)

Former members

- The Rev (James "Jimmy" Sullivan) – drums, backing vocals, piano (1999–2009; his death); lead vocals (2007–2009)
- Matt Wendt – bass (1999–2000)
- Justin Sane (Justin Meacham) – bass, piano (2000–2001)
- Dameon Ash – bass (2001–2002)
- Arin Ilejay – drums (2013–2015; session and touring 2011–2013)

Former session and touring musicians

- Mike Portnoy – drums (2010)

Timeline

== Discography ==
Studio albums

- Sounding the Seventh Trumpet (2001)
- Waking the Fallen (2003)
- City of Evil (2005)
- Avenged Sevenfold (2007)
- Nightmare (2010)
- Hail to the King (2013)
- The Stage (2016)
- Life Is But a Dream... (2023)

== Accolades ==
Year	Nominated work	Award	Result
2005	Avenged Sevenfold	Kerrang! Awards: Best Live Band	Nominated
2006	Avenged Sevenfold	MTV Music Awards: Best New Artist	Won
2006	Avenged Sevenfold	Golden God Awards: Best International Band	Won
2006	Synyster Gates on City of Evil	Total Guitar: Guitarist of the Year	Won
2006	Synyster Gates on City of Evil	Dimebag Darrell "Young Shredder" Awards	Won
2006	Avenged Sevenfold	Kerrang! Awards: Best Band on the Planet	Nominated
2008	Avenged Sevenfold	Kerrang! Awards: Best International Band	Nominated
2008	Avenged Sevenfold	Kerrang! Awards: Best Live Band	Nominated
2008	Avenged Sevenfold	Kerrang! Awards: Album of the Year	Won
2010	The Rev on Nightmare	Golden God Awards: Best Drummer	Won
2010	Avenged Sevenfold	Kerrang! Awards: Best International Band	Nominated
2011	Mike Portnoy on Nightmare	Golden God Awards: Best Drummer	Won
2011	Synyster Gates & Zacky Vengeance on Nightmare	Golden God Awards: Best Guitarists	Won
2011	M. Shadows on Nightmare	Golden God Awards: Best Vocalist	Won
2011	Nightmare	Golden God Awards: Album of the Year	Won
2011	Best Live Band	Golden God Awards: Best Live Band	Nominated
2011	Best Live Band	Kerrang! Awards: Best Live Band	Nominated
2011	Avenged Sevenfold	Loudwire Music Awards: Live Act of the Year	Won
2011	Nightmare	Kerrang! Awards: Best Single	Nominated
2011	Nightmare	Kerrang! Awards: Best Album	Nominated
2011	Avenged Sevenfold	Kerrang! Awards: Best International Band	Nominated
2011	"Buried Alive"	Revolver Magazine: Song of the Year	Nominated
2012	Best Live Band	Golden God Awards: Best Live Band	Won
2012	Most Dedicated Fans	Golden God Awards: Most Dedicated Fans	Won
2013	"Carry On"	Golden God Awards: Song of the Year	Nominated
2013	"Hail to the King"	Loudwire Music Awards: Best Rock Song	Won
2013	Hail to the King	Loudwire Music Awards: Rock Album of the Year	Nominated
2013	Avenged Sevenfold	Loudwire Music Awards: Rock Band of the Year	Won
2013	Avenged Sevenfold	Loudwire Music Awards: Most Devoted Fans	Nominated
2014	Most Dedicated Fans	Golden God Awards: Most Dedicated Fans	Won
2014	Hail to the King	Golden God Awards: Album of the Year	Nominated
2014	M. Shadows on Hail to the King	Golden God Awards: Best Vocalist	Nominated
2014	Synyster Gates & Zacky Vengeance on Hail to the King	Golden God Awards: Best Guitarists	Won
2014	Arin Ilejay on Hail to the King	Golden God Awards: Best Drummer	Won
2014	Johnny Christ on Hail to the King	Golden God Awards: Best Bassist	Nominated
2014	"Hail to the King"	Golden God Awards: Song of the Year	Nominated
2014	Avenged Sevenfold	Golden God Awards: Best International Band	Won
2016	Synyster Gates & Zacky Vengeance on The Stage	Total Guitar: Best Metal Guitarists in the World	Won
2017	Avenged Sevenfold	Golden God Awards: Best International Band	Won
2017	The Stage	Loudwire Music Awards: Metal Album of the Year	Won
2018	"The Stage"	Grammy Awards: Best Rock Song	Nominated
