= Almost Easy =

Single by Avenged Sevenfold

from the album Avenged Sevenfold
- Released: September 18, 2007
- Recorded: 2007
- Venue: Sunset Sound (Los Angeles); Eldorado (Hollywood); Burbank (Hollywood); Capitol (Hollywood)
- Genre: Thrash metal; hard rock
- Length: 3:54
- Label: Warner Bros.
- Songwriter: The Rev
- Producer: Avenged Sevenfold

Avenged Sevenfold singles chronology
| "Critical Acclaim" (2007) | "Almost Easy" (2007) | "Afterlife" (2008) |

"Almost Easy" is a song by American heavy metal band Avenged Sevenfold. It is the second song as well as lead single from their self-titled fourth album. The song is one of the band's most popular tracks, and has been certified Platinum by the RIAA.

== Background ==
"Almost Easy" was written by band drummer The Rev.

The song first premiered at a concert in Virginia during Avenged Sevenfold's appearances during 2007's Warped Tour. The song was officially released on September 18, 2007 through online music stores such as iTunes and URGE.

=== Appearances ===
The song was included on Transformers: Revenge of the Fallen soundtrack. Originally, it was planned to be on the 2007 Transformers soundtrack; however, it was not finished in time. The song is available as downloadable content for Guitar Hero III: Legends of Rock as of March 6, 2008, and featured again as part of the Avenged Sevenfold track pack for Guitar Hero 5. The song is also featured in Rock Band 2.

On the Diamonds in the Rough album an alternate mix of "Almost Easy" is included. This version, mixed by Chris Lord-Alge, included triggered drums, alternate vocals, and louder guitars and pianos. This version was also featured in the 2007 racing video game Need for Speed: ProStreet.

In December 2008 it was announced that the USC Trojan Marching Band would perform the song at the Rose Bowl halftime show on January 1, 2009.

== Music video ==
The band released a video for "Almost Easy" with director P.R. Brown. The video debuted on Fuse's The Sauce on September 24, 2007 and MTV2's Unleashed on October 1, 2007.

The video shows the band playing on a barren wasteland whilst they appear to be aflame. Over a ridge, a huge crowd of hundreds of people appear, walking in a zombie-like fashion towards the band, only to stop at a large gaping hole and jump downwards, into what appears to be Hell. Special effects show some parts where the people have skulls for faces.

At the end of the video, when the last person jumps down the cavern, the camera zooms out from the band, showing that the hole the people were jumping into was actually the eye of the band's logo, the "Deathbat". The band stated in an interview with Fuse host Steven Smith on Steven's Untitled Rock Show that the inspiration for the video came from a Wendy's commercial they saw in Asia in which a large crowd is running toward the same hamburger.

M. Shadows then said "Wouldn't it be cool if we (Avenged Sevenfold) were playing in a fiery blaze and a bunch of people were running towards us," an idea that would eventually become the video.

== Track listing ==
iTunes and UK single

1. "Almost Easy" – 3:54
2. "Walk" – 5:20
3. "Almost Easy" (live) – 3:53

UK promo single

1. "Almost Easy" – 3:55

UK single

1. "Almost Easy" – 3:56
2. "Almost Easy" (live) – 3:53

Note: All versions have exactly the same album version of "Almost Easy" (except for the live version). Simply, each version has one more second of silence at the end.

== Personnel ==
Avenged Sevenfold

- M. Shadows – lead vocals, backing vocals
- Zacky Vengeance – rhythm guitar, backing vocals
- The Rev - drums, percussion, piano, backing vocals
- Synyster Gates – lead guitar, backing vocals
- Johnny Christ – bass guitar, backing vocals

Session musicians

- Piano by Greg Kurstin

Production

- Produced by Avenged Sevenfold
- Engineered by Fred Archambault and Dave Schiffman, assisted by Clifton Allen, Chris Steffen, Robert DeLong, Aaron Walk, Mike Scielzi, and Josh Wilbur
- Mixed by Andy Wallace
- Mastered by Brian Gardner
- Drum tech by Mike Fasano
- Guitar tech by Walter Rice
- 'Fan Producers for a Day' (MVI) by Daniel McLaughlin and Christopher Guinn

== Charts ==
=== Weekly charts ===
Weekly chart performance for "Almost Easy"
| Chart (2007–2008) | Peak position |
|---|---|
| Scotland Singles (OCC) | 35 |
| UK Singles (OCC) | 67 |
| UK Rock & Metal (OCC) | 1 |
| US Bubbling Under Hot 100 (Billboard) | 6 |
| US Mainstream Rock (Billboard) | 3 |
| US Alternative Airplay (Billboard) | 6 |

=== Year-end charts ===
Year-end chart performance for "Almost Easy"
| Chart (2008) | Position |
|---|---|
| US Alternative Airplay (Billboard) | 28 |
| US Mainstream Rock (Billboard) | 12 |

== Certifications ==
Certifications for "Almost Easy"
| Region | Certification | Certified units/sales |
|---|---|---|
| United States (RIAA) | Platinum | 1,000,000^{‡} |
^{‡} Sales+streaming figures based on certification alone.
