= Zacky Vengeance =

American musician (born 1981)

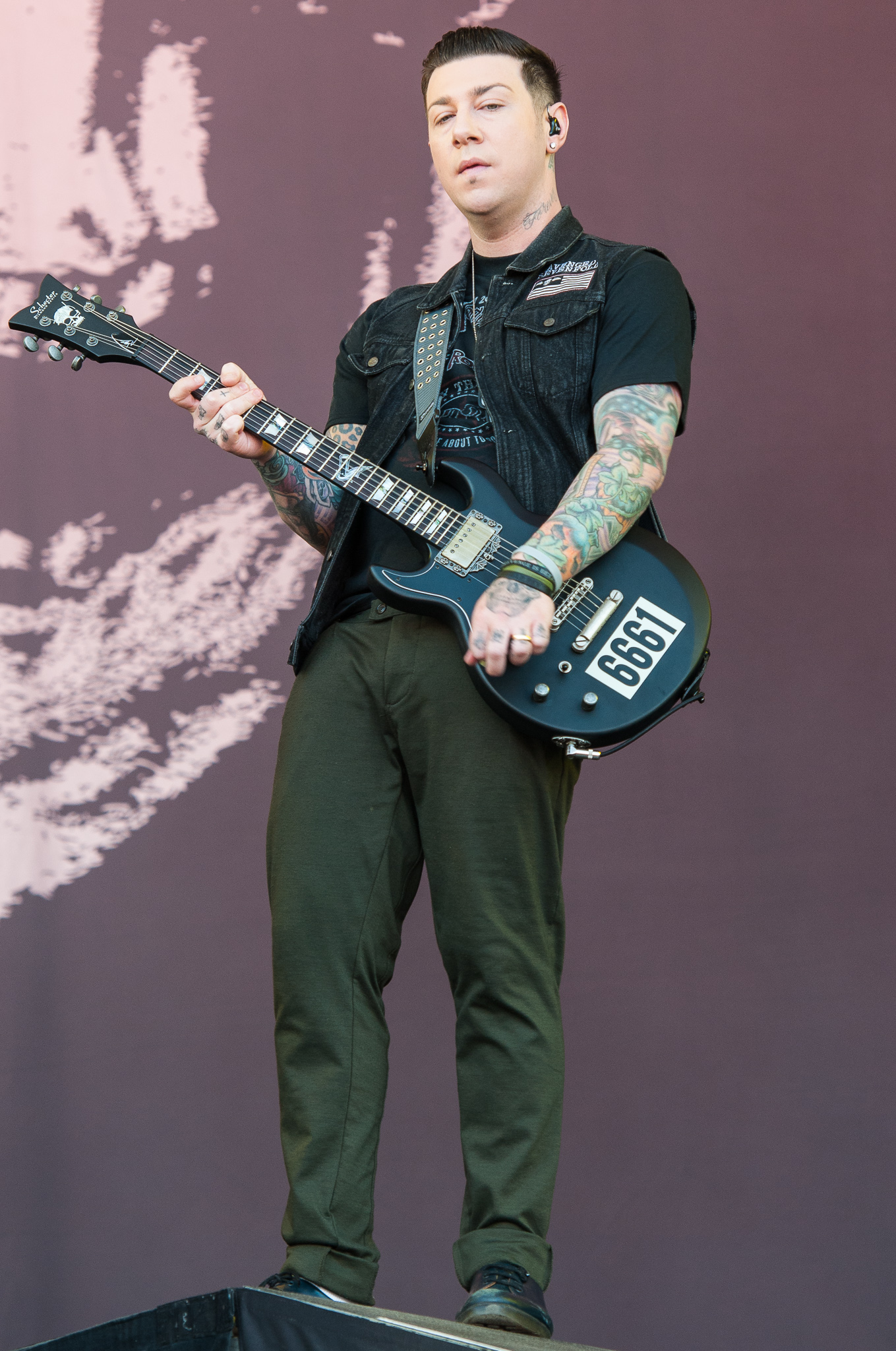
- Zacky Vengeance performing in 2014 with his Schecter Signature S-1 '6661' Guitar

Background information
- Also known as: Zacky Vengeance; Zacky V.
- Born: Zachary James Baker; December 11, 1981 (age 44); Olympia, Washington, U.S.
- Origin: Huntington Beach, California, U.S.
- Genres: Heavy metal; progressive metal; metalcore; country
- Occupation: Musician
- Instrument: Guitar
- Years active: 1999–present
- Member of: Avenged Sevenfold

Zachary James Baker (born December 11, 1981), better known by his stage name Zacky Vengeance, is an American musician who is the rhythm guitarist and a founding member of the heavy metal band Avenged Sevenfold. In 2016, Baker was voted as Best Metal Guitarist in the World by Total Guitar alongside his bandmate, Synyster Gates.

== Early life and education ==
Baker was born to Maria and James Baker in Olympia, Washington, and later moved to Huntington Beach, California along with his older sister Zina and younger brother Matthew, during his high school years. Baker's father was a guitarist and a music fan with a large record collection, through which Baker was exposed to The Beatles. His first guitar was a right-handed Yamaha acoustic. Baker attended Huntington Beach High School his freshman year after moving from Seattle, Washington, and formed Avenged Sevenfold there with M. Shadows and The Rev. The first single he bought was "Something To Believe In" by Poison. He begged his mom to buy it for him after he had heard it on the radio. His first exposure to punk music was through his sister bringing him to a show. The first album he bought was Flesh & Blood by Poison. His first concert was a performance by The Monkees in a minor league baseball stadium. He said it "fucking sucked." The first show he played was in a coffee shop in Huntington Beach. Before Avenged Sevenfold, his first band was a crust punk band called Society Down. He said before that a demo exists, but it was lost years ago. After Society Down, he formed a punk band called MPA*, which stands for Mad Porno Action. He implied that they were both unsuccessful. He also came up with Jonathan Seward's stage name "Johnny Christ," saying it suited him. Baker was also responsible for the creation of the initialism "A7X".

== Artistry ==
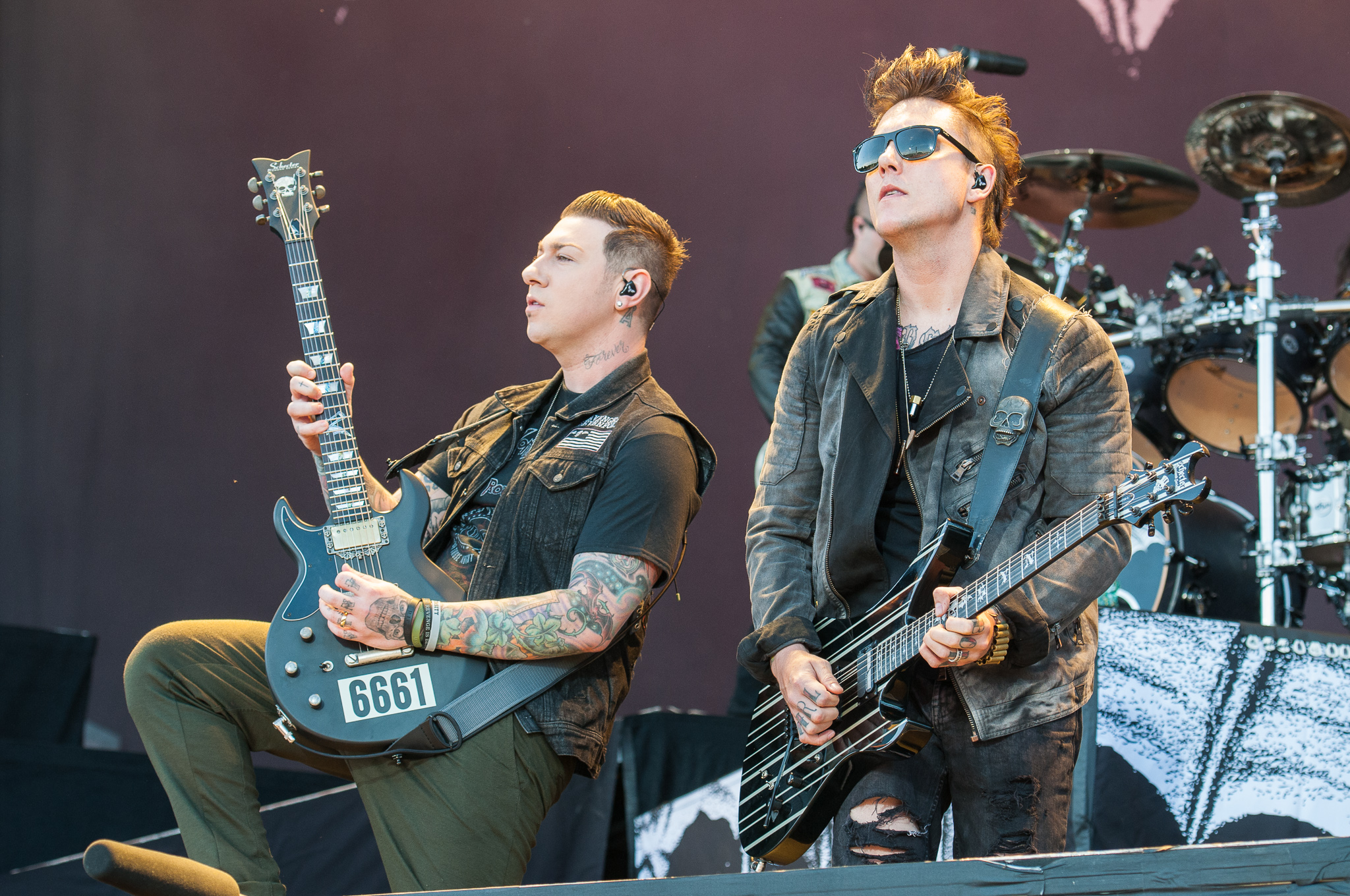
Zacky Vengeance with Synyster Gates live at Nova Rock Festival 2014

Baker is a self-taught musician, and claims to have never had a guitar lesson in his life. He learned guitar by copying his favorite albums. He said: "I never had any formal training. My teachers were Dimebag Darrell and Slash and the guys in Rancid and Slayer." He told Ultimate Guitar in 2017: "I couldn't tell you the name of a chord. If someone told me I had to tune my guitar down to a C#, and my guitar tech didn't hand it to me already tuned, I would not be able to tune it. [...] If you told me to play an A chord, I wouldn't even know what it was made of. I don't even know what's on my pedalboard -- my tech controls it all. If I had to write a solo, it would probably take me all day and sound pretty poor. [...] I just learned to play by feel, by listening, by playing stuff that sounded cool."

Baker has shown himself to be capable of fingerstyle guitar.

=== Equipment ===
While he used Gibson Les Paul models early in Avenged Sevenfold's career, Baker is best known for his use of the Schecter Guitar Research S-1 model. The S-1 is Schecter's take on the Gibson Les Paul Double-Cutout model. Schecter first made signature guitars for Synyster Gates and Zacky Vengeance around 2005. His signature models are built with a solid mahogany body and set neck with standard Nashville-style Tune-O-Matic bridge and tailpiece, like those on a Gibson Les Paul guitar. Fingerboard inlays vary, but are usually the same as the standard S-1 model with a custom 12th fret inlay on a rosewood fingerboard with 22 extra jumbo frets with a 24.75" scale length. All S-1 based signature models are equipped with Seymour Duncan's SH-4 Jeff Beck and SH-1n P.A.F. chrome covered passive pickups. Aside from a few unique customs, his signature models have a decal at the bottom of the body that read "6661", the year Avenged Sevenfold formed, 1999, upside down and backwards. In 2025, Schecter released two new signature models: the white H6LLYW66D and black H6LLYW66D-S, both based on the Gibson SG shape, now equipped with Schecter USA Custom Shop "Pasadena Custom" pickups (and a SUSTAINIAC in the neck position for the H6LLYW66D-S model).

In 2024 Schecter released the ZV-H6LLYW66D, a new signature guitar model for Baker. It is available in both left and right-handed varieties.

== Other projects ==
In 2025, Baker remixed the track "Meine Welt" by German singer Till Lindemann with his brother Matthew Garrett Baker (also known as Megabot). That same year, Baker released his debut solo single "Dark Horse" on December 17, under his given name Zachary Baker. He said a full length solo album was to follow.

== Personal life ==
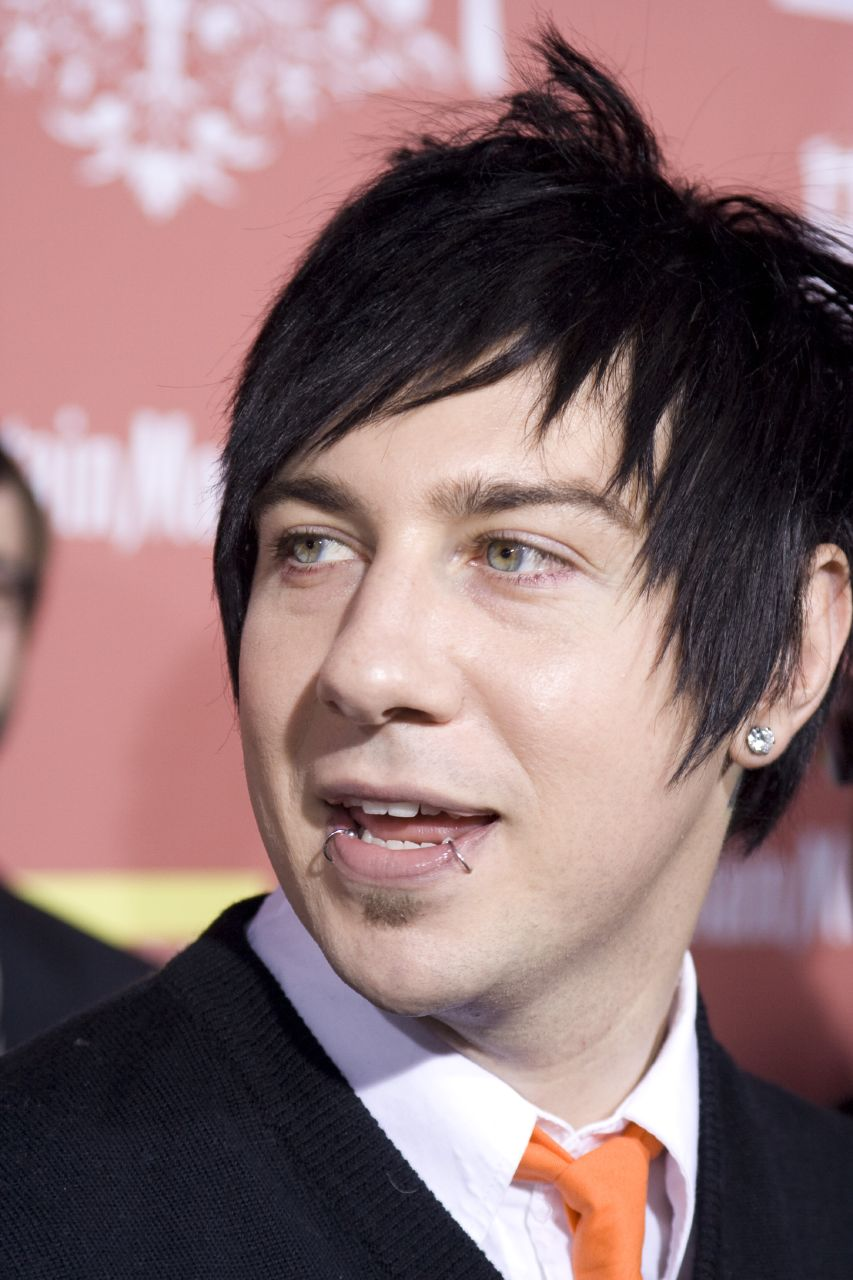
Zacky Vengeance in 2007

Baker has been married twice. First to former Playboy creator Gena Paulhus, and one with Meaghan Johnson. As of 2025, he is dating Erika Gurry, also known as “Erika Love” who was a former Project Runway Model.

== Discography ==
=== Avenged Sevenfold ===
- Sounding the Seventh Trumpet (2001)
- Waking the Fallen (2003)
- City of Evil (2005)
- Avenged Sevenfold (2007)
- Live in the LBC & Diamonds in the Rough (2008)
- Nightmare (2010)
- Hail to the King (2013)
- The Stage (2016)
- Life Is But a Dream... (2023)

=== Solo albums ===
- Dark Horse (2026)
