= The Rev =

American musician (1981–2009)

James "The Rev" Sullivan
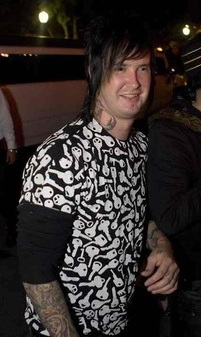

Background information
- Also known as: The Rev; Jimmy; Rathead; The Knife Master
- Born: James Owen Sullivan; February 9, 1981; Tustin, California, U.S.
- Origin: Huntington Beach, California, U.S.
- Died: December 28, 2009 (aged 28) Huntington Beach, California, U.S.
- Genres: Heavy metal; metalcore; experimental metal; ska punk; alternative metal
- Occupations: Musician; songwriter
- Instruments: Drums; vocals; piano
- Years active: 1998–2009
- Formerly of: Avenged Sevenfold; Pinkly Smooth; Suburban Legends

James Owen Sullivan (February 9, 1981 – December 28, 2009), also known by his stage name The Rev (shortened from his prior stage name The Reverend Tholomew Plague), was an American musician and songwriter. He was the drummer, pianist, backing vocalist, and occasional co-lead vocalist of the heavy metal band Avenged Sevenfold, which he co-founded in 1999. He was previously the lead vocalist and pianist of the avant-garde metal band Pinkly Smooth and drummer for the ska punk band Suburban Legends from 1998 to 1999.

== Early life ==
James Owen Sullivan was born on February 9, 1981 in Tustin, California. He was of Irish descent and was raised Catholic in Huntington Beach, California. He received his first pair of drumsticks at the age of five and his own drum set at the age of twelve. While in high school, he started playing in bands.

== Career ==
=== Avenged Sevenfold ===
Before leaving to join Avenged Sevenfold as one of the band's founding members, Sullivan was the drummer for the third wave ska band Suburban Legends. At the age of 19, he recorded his first album with Avenged Sevenfold, Sounding the Seventh Trumpet. His early influences included Frank Zappa and King Crimson. He stated in an interview with Modern Drummer that he "was raised on that stuff as much as rock and metal."

Sullivan was influenced by drummers Vinnie Paul, Mike Portnoy (who would later be his fill-in with Avenged Sevenfold), Dave Lombardo, Lars Ulrich, and Terry Bozzio, stating "It's funny [...], of all my influences, Tommy Lee is a visual influence. I never thought I'd have one of those." Sullivan had a signature drum fill which he called "the double-ride thing" or "the Double Octopus", stating that he did so "just for lack of a better definition". It is a short fill consisting a full bar of sixteenth single notes played unison on double bass drums and two ride cymbals, and can be heard on tracks such as "Almost Easy", "Critical Acclaim", "Crossroads", and "Dancing Dead".

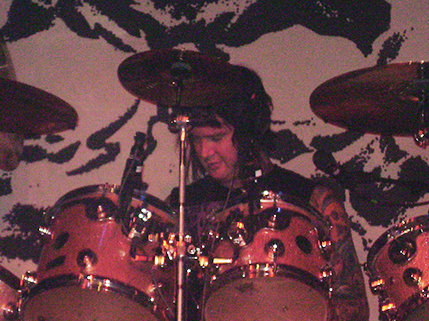
Sullivan playing drums with Avenged Sevenfold in 2008

Sullivan served as the drummer, composer, songwriter, vocalist, and pianist for the band. His vocals are featured in several Avenged Sevenfold songs, including "Strength of the World", "Afterlife", "A Little Piece of Heaven", "Almost Easy", "Scream", "Critical Acclaim", "Lost", "Brompton Cocktail", "Crossroads", "Flash of the Blade" (an Iron Maiden cover), "Art of Subconscious Illusion", "Save Me", and "Fiction". He also wrote and composed several songs for Avenged Sevenfold including "A Little Piece of Heaven", "Afterlife", "Almost Easy", "Unbound (The Wild Ride)", "Buried Alive", "Fiction", "Brompton Cocktail", "Welcome to the Family", "Save Me", among others. Avenged Sevenfold released a demo version of "Nightmare" featuring Sullivan on an electronic drumset and providing some vocals which were later used on the album Nightmare, released after his death.

At the second annual Revolver Golden God Awards, Sullivan won the award for "Best Drummer". His family members, and Avenged Sevenfold, received the posthumous honor on his behalf.

In an Ultimate Guitar online readers' poll of the "Top Ten Greatest Drummers of All Time", Sullivan appeared at No. 8, placing higher than Bill Ward of Black Sabbath and lower than Keith Moon of the Who. In 2017, he once again appeared in Ultimate Guitar's list of Top 25 Greatest Singing Drummers, at No. 5.

=== Pinkly Smooth ===
Pinkly Smooth was an avant-garde metal band formed in 2001 in Huntington Beach, California, as a side project of Sullivan. It originally featured him (under the name "Rathead") on vocals, along with fellow Avenged Sevenfold member Synyster Gates on guitar and former Ballistico band members Buck Silverspur (under the name "El Diablo") on bass, as well as Derek Eglit (under the name "Super Loop") on drums. They released only one album, Unfortunate Snort, which featured former Avenged Sevenfold bassist Justin Meacham (under his stage name "Justin Sane") as a keyboard player.

== Artistry ==
Initially influenced by punk rock during his youth, Sullivan was also influenced by artists such as Frank Zappa, Dave Weckl, Terry Bozzio, Dream Theater, Pantera, Rush and Slayer.

== Death ==
On December 28, 2009, Sullivan was found unresponsive at his home in Huntington Beach, California. Upon arrival to the hospital, he was pronounced dead at the age of 28. Police stated that his death was not suspicious and appeared to be from natural causes. An autopsy performed on December 30 was inconclusive, but toxicology results released six months later revealed the cause of death to be an overdose of alcohol, diazepam, oxycodone, oxymorphone, and nordiazepam. The coroner also noted an enlarged heart as a "significant condition" that may have played a role in Sullivan's death.

On January 6, 2010, a private funeral was held for Sullivan. He was cremated, and buried at Good Shepherd Cemetery in Huntington Beach, California. Avenged Sevenfold dedicated their fifth studio album Nightmare to him, as well as songs including "So Far Away", which had been written by his bandmate and childhood friend Synyster Gates, and "Fiction", which Sullivan had written three days before his death.

Sullivan's bandmate M. Shadows later said in an interview with Hard Drive Radio, "The eeriest thing about it is there is a song on the album called 'Fiction' [a nickname Sullivan gave himself] which started out with the title 'Death'. And it was the last song The Rev wrote for the album, and when he handed it in, he said, 'That's it, that's the last song for this record.' And then, three days later, he died."

== Legacy ==
Sullivan's triple bass drum kit from the 2008 Taste of Chaos tour was donated for display at a Hard Rock Cafe in Las Vegas. It was taken down after the Hard Rock Cafe closed due to COVID-19. Another drum kit he used was displayed in a Hard Rock Cafe in Gatlinburg, Tennessee but it closed in August 2026. In 2024, Brandon Toews of Drumeo wrote: "The original drummer and founding member of Avenged Sevenfold has become an iconic figure in rock and metal with his skills, creativity, and huge personality. Though he passed away far too soon at just 28 years old, his drumming continues to make a massive impact – and he’s quickly become a legend in his own right."

== Discography ==
=== Suburban Legends ===
- Origin Edition (1999)

=== Pinkly Smooth ===
- Unfortunate Snort (2001)

=== Avenged Sevenfold ===
- Sounding the Seventh Trumpet (2001)
- Waking the Fallen (2003)
- City of Evil (2005)
- Avenged Sevenfold (2007)
- Live in the LBC & Diamonds in the Rough (2008)
- Nightmare (2010) (posthumous; lyrics, composing and vocals featured; vocals and drums on demo tracks; co-lead vocals on "Fiction", growl on "Save Me", songwriting on all songs)
- Life Is But a Dream... (2023) (posthumous; bridge melody on "Mattel" and lyrics on "Beautiful Morning")

=== with Brian Haner ===
- Fistfight at the Wafflehouse (2010) (posthumous; drums on "Bring My Baby Back")
