= Johnny Christ =

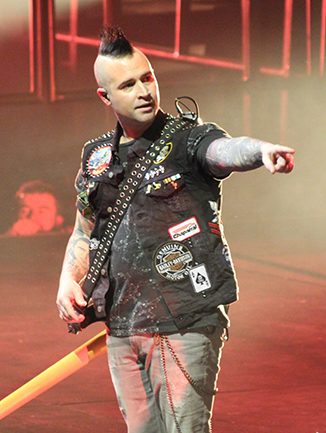
- Christ in 2017

Background information
- Born: Jonathan Lewis Seward; November 18, 1984 (age 42); Huntington Beach, California, U.S.
- Genres: Heavy metal; progressive metal; experimental metal; metalcore
- Occupation: Bassist
- Years active: 2002–present
- Member of: Avenged Sevenfold
- Website: avengedsevenfold.com

Jonathan Lewis Seward, better known by his stage name Johnny Christ, is an American bass guitarist, best known as the bassist for heavy metal band Avenged Sevenfold since 2002.

He has been individually interviewed by publications such as WOUB-FM, WGRD-FM, KLAQ, Metal Injection, Loudwire, Entertainment Weekly, Revolver, Ultimate Guitar and Blabbermouth.net.

He hosts a podcast called "Drinks with Johnny".

== Early life and education ==
Jonathan Lewis Seward was born in Huntington Beach, California on November 18th, 1984. He has a sister named Alexandria and an unnamed brother, who introduced him to Avenged Sevenfold members; guitarist, Synyster Gates and drummer, The Rev, as stated in 2007’s All Excess, a video documentary about the band's 2005 effort, City of Evil. He dropped out of high school in 2002 to join Avenged Sevenfold on tour.

== Avenged Sevenfold ==
Seward joined Avenged Sevenfold as their new bassist in 2002 after their previous bassist Dameon Ash quit the band in the middle of a tour. Seward’s first studio album with the band, Waking the Fallen was released on August 26, 2003, which took the band into a higher tier of the underground west coast heavy metal scene. The band's third album, City of Evil was released on June 6, 2005, featuring singles "Bat Country", "Beast and the Harlot" and more, shot the band into the mainstream, this success continued with 2007’s self titled album, with modern-classic songs like, "Afterlife", "Critical Acclaim" and "Almost Easy". On December 28, 2009, the band was hit with a change that would shake the band and lead to a huge change in their style, the bands drummer and lead songwriter, Jimmy ‘The Rev’ Sullivan, passed away aged 28 from a drug overdose. The band decided to finish the last of Sullivan’s work. With drumming contributed by Dream Theater drummer Mike Portnoy, Nightmare was released on July 23, 2010, and proved to be a hit among the bands fans. In 2012, Avenged Sevenfold composed Carry On for the Call of Duty: Black Ops II soundtrack. The band’s first major stylistic change came with 2013’s Hail to the King, being a commercial success. 2016’s The Stage featured the band’s new permanent drummer, Brooks Wackerman, was the last album before the band took an extended break until 2023’s Life Is But a Dream..., which marked a total change in style towards progressive metal.

=== Bass playing style ===
Seward stated that he did not frequently play bass with his fingers prior to The Stage. He said of his mindset and approach to heavy metal bass playing: "What it really comes down to, especially in metal, is that the bass needs to cut through, so you go to the pick for that effect. But when you have a certain feel about the music and really dig in to get a big growl, you have to go with the fingers, because you're not going to get it with a pick."

== Personal life ==
Earlier in his career, he admitted to partaking in trips to strip clubs with his bandmates and other friends in the industry.

He has one son, Franklin James.

== Discography ==
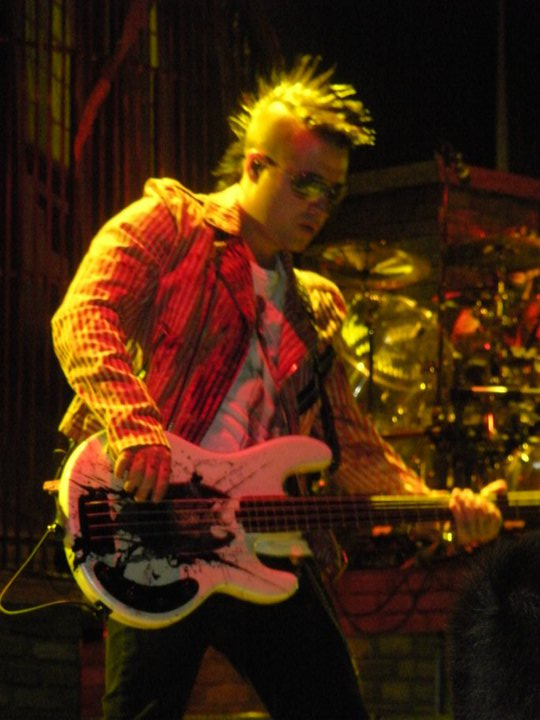
Christ performing in 2010

=== With Avenged Sevenfold ===
- Waking the Fallen (2003)
- City of Evil (2005)
- Avenged Sevenfold (2007)
- Nightmare (2010)
- Hail to the King (2013)
- The Stage (2016)
- Life Is But a Dream... (2023)

== Equipment ==
Christ has recently used instruments made by Schecter Guitar Research, along with the rest of Avenged Sevenfold, however he also strays from this, most notably with his use of Ernie Ball Music Man Stingray basses, and highly praised the Fender Precision Bass he used whilst recording Nightmare. He has a signature Schecter model, along with all other guitarists in Avenged Sevenfold. Christ is well known to use Gallien Krueger and Ampeg amplifiers.
