= MVI =

MVI stands for Musical Video Interactive, a DVD-based container format for packing audio, video and interactive visual content (for example, lyrics) onto one disk. The first commercial disc released with this technology was Snakes & Arrows by Rush on May 15, 2007.

The audio content is provided in multiple formats, including a high-definition version (a minimum of 24-bit at 48kHz sampling) and an MP3 version for copying to portable audio players. The video content is compatible with DVD video, and can also optionally include high-definition video.

No new MVI releases have been made since 2012.
