= I Won't See You Tonight =

Song by Avenged Sevenfold

from the album Waking the Fallen
- Released: August 26, 2003
- Recorded: April – June 2003
- Studio: Third Stone, Hollywood, California; Mates Inc, Hollywood, California
- Genre: Metalcore; heavy metal; hard rock
- Length: 8:59 (Part 1); 4:45 (Part 2)
- Label: Hopeless
- Songwriter: Avenged Sevenfold
- Producers: Mudrock; Fred Archambault

Waking the Fallen track listing
- 12 tracks: 1. "Waking the Fallen"; 2. "Unholy Confessions"; 3. "Chapter Four"; 4. "Remenissions"; 5. "Desecrate Through Reverence"; 6. "Eternal Rest"; 7. "Second Heartbeat"; 8. "Radiant Eclipse"; 9. "I Won't See You Tonight Part 1"; 10. "I Won't See You Tonight Part 2"; 11. "Clairvoyant Disease"; 12. "And All Things Will End

"I Won't See You Tonight" is a two-part song by American heavy metal band Avenged Sevenfold. The songs appeared on their second studio album, Waking the Fallen, as tracks 9 and 10 respectively. The song peaked at #2 on the overall US song sales chart in 2014.

== Composition ==
The first portion, "I Won't See You Tonight Part 1" is a power ballad, while "I Won't See You Tonight Part 2" is much faster, and more in line with the metalcore sound the band played in their early days. The Rev's drumming on (Part 2) was reportedly inspired by the work of drummer Paul Bostaph from Slayer.

The song's lyrical matter was inspired by the band's former bassist Justin Sane. Around August 2001, Sane attempted suicide by drinking excessive amounts of cough syrup. During Sane's hospitalization, he remained in poor condition and had to leave the band. In an interview, lead singer M. Shadows said of Sane that "he perma-fried his brain and was in a mental institution for a long time, and when you have someone in your band who does that, it ruins everything that's going on all around you, and it makes you want to do something to prevent it from happening to other people."

== Critical reception ==
In 2021, Return of Rock ranked the song(s) at number 19 on its list of the 20 greatest Avenged Sevenfold songs. It was also featured on Revolver's list of the best non-hair metal power-ballads. It was described on the latter list as "the most powerful (ballad) in (the band's) repertoire".

== Personnel ==
Credits are adapted from the album's liner notes.

Avenged Sevenfold

- M. Shadows – lead vocals
- Zacky Vengeance – rhythm guitar
- The Rev – drums
- Synyster Gates – lead guitar, piano
- Johnny Christ – bass guitar

Production

- Andrew Murdock – producer, mixing engineer
- Fred Archambault – co-producer
- THE GATEKEEPERS - recording
- Ai Fujisaki – assistant engineer
- Tom Baker – mastering engineer
- Mike Fasano, Bruce Jacoby, Al Pahanish – drum tech
- Stephen Ferrara – guitar tech
- Scott Gilman – orchestral arrangements and performance

== Charts ==
Chart (2014)	Peak position
US Hot Singles Sales (Billboard)	2
