= Second Heartbeat =

Song by Avenged Sevenfold

from the album Waking the Fallen
- Released: August 26, 2003
- Recorded: April – June 2003
- Studio: Third Stone, Hollywood, California; Mates Inc, Hollywood, California
- Genre: Metalcore; melodic death metal
- Length: 7:01
- Label: Hopeless
- Songwriter: Avenged Sevenfold
- Producers: Mudrock; Fred Archambault

Waking the Fallen track listing
- 12 tracks: 1. "Waking the Fallen"; 2. "Unholy Confessions"; 3. "Chapter Four"; 4. "Remenissions"; 5. "Desecrate Through Reverence"; 6. "Eternal Rest"; 7. "Second Heartbeat"; 8. "Radiant Eclipse"; 9. "I Won't See You Tonight Part 1"; 10. "I Won't See You Tonight Part 2"; 11. "Clairvoyant Disease"; 12. "And All Things Will End

"Second Heartbeat" is a song by American heavy metal band Avenged Sevenfold, and is the seventh track on their second studio album, Waking the Fallen. The song is one of the most popular from the album, and is praised by fans and critics alike.

== Background ==
An early version of "Second Heartbeat" was recorded in 2002, and appeared on the compilation "Hopelessly Devoted To You Vol. 4". This early version was shorter and faster. The band showed this version of the song to producer Mudrock to convince him to produce their second album, which he would end up doing. It was later included on the 2014 Waking the Fallen: Resurrected reissue. In the band's early career, it was a live staple.

== Critical reception ==
"Second Heartbeat" is widely regarded as one of the band's best songs. In 2020, Louder Sound and Kerrang ranked the song at number two and number ten, respectively, on their lists of the 20 greatest Avenged Sevenfold songs. Return of Rock also ranked it as the best song from its parent album.

== Personnel ==
Credits are adapted from the album's liner notes.

Avenged Sevenfold

- M. Shadows – lead vocals
- Zacky Vengeance – rhythm guitar
- The Rev – drums
- Synyster Gates – lead guitar
- Johnny Christ – bass guitar

Production

- Andrew Murdock – producer, mixing engineer
- Fred Archambault – co-producer
- The Gatekeepers – recording
- Ai Fujisaki – assistant engineer
- Tom Baker – mastering engineer
- Mike Fasano, Bruce Jacoby, Al Pahanish – drum tech
- Stephen Ferrara – guitar tech
