= Beast and the Harlot =

Single by Avenged Sevenfold

from the album City of Evil
- B-side: "Burn It Down" (live in San Diego)
- Released: February 28, 2006
- Recorded: January 1 – April 18, 2005
- Studio: The Hobby Shop (Los Angeles); Ocean Way (Hollywood)
- Genre: Heavy metal; pop-punk
- Length: 5:41 (album version); 4:06 (edit)
- Label: Warner Bros.
- Songwriter: Avenged Sevenfold
- Producers: Andrew Murdock; Avenged Sevenfold

Avenged Sevenfold singles chronology
"Bat Country" (2005)	"Beast and the Harlot" (2006)	"Seize the Day" (2006)

Music video
- "Beast and the Harlot" on YouTube

"Beast and the Harlot" is a song by American heavy metal band Avenged Sevenfold, released as a single from their third studio album, City of Evil. It peaked at number 19 on the US Mainstream Rock chart, number 44 on the UK Singles Chart, and number 1 on the UK Rock Chart on March 12, 2006.

The cover art for the single of the song was done by Avenged Sevenfold's close friend Cam Rackam.

== Composition and lyrics ==
Musically, the track has been described as "utterly ridiculous and over-blown" by The Skinny. The track makes strong use of melody in the guitar work. Some of the song's lead guitar parts are variations of the main riff. The vocal cadences contain hooks. The song's structure is described as "straightforward". The song is one of the first songs recorded with M. Shadows' different vocal style avoiding unclean vocals as well as a more hard rock sound as opposed to their previous work, with heavy and fast riffs.

Lyrically, "Beast and the Harlot" is about the fall of Babylon, the Great from the Book of Revelation (particularly chapter seventeen), from which many quotes are taken, such as "Seven headed beast, ten horns raise from his head", "hatred strips her and leaves her naked", and other references. The Harlot referred to in the song is Great Babylon, quoted in the song, "Fallen now is Babylon, the Great". On Avenged Sevenfold's All Excess DVD, Tony Petrossian, who directed the video, says that M. Shadows' lyrics for this song about the fall of Babylon is comparing Babylon to Hollywood, showing many Hollywood clichés such as the young, innocent boys being corrupted and losing their souls. In the music video, the Harlot was played by actress Elizabeth Melendez.

The title of City of Evil is taken from a line in the song.

== Reception ==
The song's rapid main riff was voted as the 14th greatest riff ever by the guitar magazine Total Guitar in March 2007. Total Guitar wrote: "The main riff to Beast and the Harlot is a great piece of dropped-D riffing with Zacky and Synyster cleverly placing the second part of the riff across the beat to create an aggressive syncopated feel, once again avoiding all the usual metal clichés".

In 2013, the staff of Loudwire included the song's main riff in their list of "the 10 Best Metal Riffs of the 2000s".

== Other appearances ==
"Beast and the Harlot" has appeared on many other Avenged Sevenfold releases. A live version was featured as the B-side to "Bat Country", and also featured on Masters of Horror. The song was featured as the second track on their greatest hits album.

The song was featured in the soundtrack of the video games Burnout Revenge, Guitar Hero II, Guitar Hero Smash Hits, Rock Band 3, and Rocksmith. The version in Guitar Hero II was a cover version, while Smash Hits featured the master recording. The song was also featured in The Real World Road Rules reunion. The cover art for the single of the song was done by Avenged Sevenfold's close friend Cam Rackam. The Rock Band 3 version of the original master recording of the song being notable in that it has support for Rock Band PRO mode, which takes advantage of the use of a real guitar / bass guitar, along with standard MIDI-compatible electronic drum kits / keyboards in addition to up to three-part harmony and/or backing vocals.

== Track listings ==
Digital
No.	Title	Length
1.	"Beast and the Harlot" (radio version)	4:06
2.	"Burn It Down" (live in San Diego)	5:45

CD
No.	Title	Length
1.	"Beast and the Harlot" (edit)	4:06
2.	"Beast and the Harlot"	5:42

Vinyl
No.	Title	Length
1.	"Beast and the Harlot" (radio version; side A)	4:06
2.	"Burn It Down" (live in San Diego; side B)	5:45

== Personnel ==
Personnel listing as adapted from the album's liner notes.

Avenged Sevenfold

- M. Shadows – lead vocals
- Zacky Vengeance – rhythm guitar, co-lead guitar, backing vocals (live tracks)
- The Rev – drums
- Synyster Gates – lead guitar, piano, backing vocals (live tracks)
- Johnny Christ – bass

Production

- Produced by Mudrock and Avenged Sevenfold, with additional production by Fred Archambault and Scott Gilman
- Mixed by Andy Wallace
- Pro Tools by John O'Mahony, assisted by Steve Sisco
- Mastered by Eddie Schreyer
- Additional vocal production by the Rev, Synyster Gates and M. Shadows
- Orchestration by Scott Gilman, the Rev, Synyster Gates and M. Shadows
- Drum tech – Mike Fasano
- Guitar tech – Stephen Ferrara-Grand

== Charts ==
Chart (2006)	Peak position
US Mainstream Rock (Billboard)	19
US Alternative Airplay (Billboard)	40
UK Singles (Official Charts)	44
UK Rock & Metal (Official Charts)	1

== Accolades ==
Region	Year	Publication	Accolade	Rank
United States	2015	Loudwire	10 Best Metal Riffs of the 2000s	7
