= Seize the Day (song) =

2005 Avenged Sevenfold song

Single by Avenged Sevenfold

from the album City of Evil
- Released: July 11, 2006
- Recorded: January 1 – April 18, 2005
- Studio: The Hobby Shop (Los Angeles); Ocean Way (Hollywood)
- Length: 5:35 (album version); 4:45 (radio edit)
- Label: Warner
- Songwriter: Avenged Sevenfold
- Producers: Andrew Murdock; Avenged Sevenfold; Fred Archambault

Avenged Sevenfold singles chronology
"Beast and the Harlot" (2006)	"Seize the Day" (2006)	"Walk" (2007)

Music video
- "Seize the Day" on YouTube

"Seize the Day" is a power ballad by American heavy metal band Avenged Sevenfold. It was released on July 11, 2006, as a promotional single for their third studio album, City of Evil. Additionally, the song was released on July 27, 2010, as a downloadable track for the video game Rock Band 2, along with "Nightmare" and "Scream".

== Music ==
According to Chad Childers of Loudwire, "Seize the Day" is stylistically "a little on the softer side" than what is typically expected from Avenged Sevenfold. He described the song's lyrics as "inspirational".

== Music video ==
The video depicts M. Shadows and then girlfriend (now wife) Valary laughing and shooting footage of each other- they are expecting a child. The rest of the band come to his house and pick him up so they can rob a liquor store. In the process, Shadows gets caught by the police while the others drive off, leaving him behind. He goes to jail, where after his wife comes to visit him. They get into a fight; while driving home his wife is hit by a van. A funeral scene follows, and her casket is lowered into the ground; Synyster Gates is shown playing the song's guitar solo on top of her casket. At the end of the video, Shadows is at her grave, with their son, who had survived the crash. The rest of the band come over to him, Shadows picks up his son, and the group walk away.

The video was inspired by the video for Guns N' Roses' "November Rain". M. Shadows said, "It's not us driving around in cool cars and just chilling, you know? It has a story and Guns N' Roses did those videos the best. It wasn't about looking cool and being flashy, it was about being real and showing the scenario and being true to the video". The video was directed by Wayne Isham.

In 2007, the video won a Metal Hammer Golden Gods Award for Best Video.

== Track listing ==
Promotional CD
No.	Title	Length
1.	"Seize the Day" (radio edit)	4:45
2.	"Seize the Day" (album version)	5:32

== Personnel ==
Personnel listing as adapted from album liner notes.

Avenged Sevenfold

- M. Shadows – lead vocals, backing vocals
- Zacky Vengeance – acoustic guitar, rhythm guitar, co-lead guitar, backing vocals
- The Rev – drums, piano, backing vocals
- Synyster Gates – lead guitar, backing vocals
- Johnny Christ – bass, backing vocals

Production

- Produced by Mudrock and Avenged Sevenfold, with additional production by Fred Archambault and Scott Gilman
- Mixed by Andy Wallace
- Pro Tools by John O'Mahony, assisted by Steve Sisco
- Mastered by Eddie Schreyer
- Additional vocal production by The Rev, Synyster Gates and M. Shadows
- Orchestration by Scott Gilman, The Rev, Synyster Gates and M. Shadows
- Drum tech – Mike Fasano
- Guitar tech – Stephen Ferrara-Grand

Orchestra

- Violinists – Samuel Fischer (soloist), Mark Robertson, Songa Lee-Kitto, Sam Formicola, Bruce Dukov, Alan Grunfeld, Larry Greenfield, Liane Mautner
- Violists – David Walther, Matthew Funes, Alma Fernandez
- Cellists – Victor Lawrence (soloist), David Low, David Mergen

Choir

- Choir leader – Jeannine Wagner
- Choir performers – Zachary Biggs, Colton Beyer-Johnson, Josiah Yiu, Nathan Cruz, Stephen Cruz, C.J. Cruz, Sean Sullivan, Alan Hong, Nico Walsh, Sally Stevens

== Charts ==
Chart (2006)	Peak position
US Billboard Mainstream Rock Tracks	17
US Active Rock (Billboard)	16
US Heritage Rock (Billboard)	29
