= Bat Country =

Single by Avenged Sevenfold

from the album City of Evil
- Released: August 9, 2005
- Recorded: January 1 – April 18, 2005
- Studio: The Hobby Shop (Los Angeles); Ocean Way (Hollywood)
- Genre: Heavy metal; alternative metal; hard rock
- Length: 5:13 (album version); 4:11 (radio edit)
- Label: Warner
- Songwriters: Matthew Sanders; Brian Haner Jr.; James Sullivan
- Producers: Andrew Murdock; Avenged Sevenfold; Fred Archambault

Avenged Sevenfold singles chronology
"Burn It Down" (2005)	"Bat Country" (2005)	"Beast and the Harlot" (2006)

Audio sample
- file; help

Music video
- "Bat Country" on YouTube

"Bat Country" is a song by American heavy metal band Avenged Sevenfold, released in August 2005 as the second single from their third album, City of Evil. Avenged Sevenfold won Best New Artist in a Video at the 2006 MTV Video Music Awards for "Bat Country" and the single was certified platinum by the RIAA and silver by the BPI. For these reasons, "Bat Country" is often believed to be the band's most commercially successful song.

== Background and composition ==
"Bat Country" is a heavy metal, alternative metal and hard rock song. It takes stylistic cues from punk rock and pop, drawing comparisons to My Chemical Romance. The song's main thematic influence comes from Hunter S. Thompson's 1971 novel Fear and Loathing in Las Vegas, with the title itself being a direct quote from the book in which Raoul Duke (the alter-ego pseudonym of Thompson) is on his way to Las Vegas while being affected by various drugs. The character hallucinated huge bats and manta rays in the sky, and gasps to his companion Dr. Gonzo, "We can't stop here. This is bat country".

The following quote, also included at the beginning of Fear and Loathing in Las Vegas, is referred to twice throughout the song (at the beginning and the bridge before the last chorus) and is shown at the beginning of the music video.

"He who makes a beast of himself gets rid of the pain of being a man". – Samuel Johnson

Also referenced in the song is a lyric derived from the final words spoken about Dr. Gonzo at the end of the film adaptation. The lyric is used at the end of the second breakdown of the song, as the final lyric of the song.

"There he goes. One of God's own prototypes. A high-powered mutant of some kind never even considered for mass production. Too weird to live, and too rare to die". – Raoul Duke

== Reception and legacy ==
Throughout 2008, "Bat Country" was in the top 40 of the UK Rock Chart, and shared the chart with up to three of the band's other songs (including but not limited to: "Afterlife", "Burn It Down" and "Dear God"). The song was on and off the charts throughout 2008, and eventually peaked at number 9 in December of that year.

The song was ranked at number 20 on Loudwire's Top 21st Century Hard Rock Songs. It also was rated as number 9 on Ultimate Guitar's list of Top 25 Best Songs With Guitar Duels. In 2020, Louder Sound and Kerrang! both rated it as the fifth greatest Avenged Sevenfold song. In 2023, Guitar World ranked the song's guitar solo at number 16 on its list of The Greatest Guitar Solos of the 21st Century...so far.

== In other media ==
The song appeared in the video games Madden NFL 06, NHL 06, SSX on Tour, Saints Row 2, Guitar Hero: Warriors of Rock, Rocksmith 2014, and Asphalt Legends Unite. It was released as a downloadable track for the Rock Band series. It also appeared in the movie Big Momma's House 2 and both the TV shows Bones and About a Boy.

== Track listing ==
CD
No.	Title	Length
1.	"Bat Country"	5:13
2.	"Beast and the Harlot" (live from the Warped Tour)	6:08
3.	"Bat Country" (music video)

== Personnel ==
Personnel listing as adapted from album liner notes.

Avenged Sevenfold

- M. Shadows – lead vocals, backing vocals
- Zacky Vengeance – rhythm guitar, co-lead guitar, backing vocals
- The Rev – drums, backing vocals
- Synyster Gates – lead guitar, backing vocals
- Johnny Christ – bass, backing vocals

Production

- Produced by Mudrock and Avenged Sevenfold, with additional production by Fred Archambault and Scott Gilman
- Mixed by Andy Wallace
- Pro Tools by John O'Mahony, assisted by Steve Sisco
- Mastered by Eddie Schreyer
- Additional vocal production by the Rev, Synyster Gates and M. Shadows
- Drum tech – Mike Fasano
- Guitar tech – Stephen Ferrara-Grand

== Charts ==
=== Weekly charts ===
Weekly chart performance for "Bat Country"
Chart (2005–2006)	Peak position
Scottish Singles Sales (Official Charts)	60
UK Singles (Official Charts)	84
UK Rock & Metal (Official Charts)	3
US Billboard Hot 100	60
US Alternative Airplay (Billboard)	6
US Mainstream Rock (Billboard)	2
US Active Rock Top 50 (Radio & Records)	1

=== Year-end charts ===
2005 year-end chart performance for "Bat Country"
Chart (2005)	Position
US Modern Rock Tracks (Billboard)	69

2006 year-end chart performance for "Bat Country"
Chart (2006)	Position
US Alternative Songs (Billboard)	21
US Mainstream Rock Songs (Billboard)	13

== Certifications ==
Certifications for "Bat Country"
Region	Certification	Certified units/sales
New Zealand (RMNZ)	Gold	15,000^{‡}
United Kingdom (BPI)	Silver	200,000^{‡}
United States (RIAA)	Platinum	1,000,000^{‡}
^{‡} Sales+streaming figures based on certification alone.
