= List of top 10 singles for 2007 in Australia =

This is a list of singles that charted in the top ten of the ARIA Charts in 2007.

== Top-ten singles ==
Key

Symbol	Meaning
◁	Indicates single's top 10 entry was also its ARIA top 50 debut
(#)	2007 Year-end top 10 single position and rank

List of ARIA top ten singles that peaked in 2007
Top ten entry date	Single	Artist(s)	Peak	Peak date	Weeks in top ten	References
Singles from 2006
23 October	"Light Surrounding You" ◁	Evermore	1	22 January	15	
12 November	"Smack That" ◁	Akon featuring Eminem	2	1 January	15	
12 November	"Irreplaceable" ◁	Beyoncé	1	1 January	13	
11 December	"Wind It Up" ◁	Gwen Stefani	5	8 January	7	
11 December	"Fergalicious"	Fergie featuring Will.i.am	4	15 January	9	
Singles from 2007
1 January	"Rock This Party (Everybody Dance Now)"	Bob Sinclar and Cutee B featuring Dollarman, Big Ali and Makedah	6	5 March	13	
8 January	"Say It Right"	Nelly Furtado	2	29 January	10	
22 January	"Too Little Too Late"	JoJo	10	22 January	1	
29 January	"Lips of an Angel" (#5) ◁	Hinder	1	29 January	10	
29 January	"How to Save a Life"	The Fray	2	19 February	11	
5 February	"Hit Me Up" ◁	Gia Farrell	6	12 February	6	
12 February	"This Ain't a Scene, It's an Arms Race"	Fall Out Boy	4	19 February	12	
19 February	"Put Your Hands Up 4 Detroit"	Fedde le Grand	8	26 February	3	
26 February	"I Wanna Fuck You" ◁	Akon featuring Snoop Dogg	6	26 February	7	
26 February	"The Sweet Escape" (#9) ◁	Gwen Stefani featuring Akon	2	26 February	14	
5 March	"Keep Your Hands off My Girl" ◁	Good Charlotte	5	12 March	3	
12 March	"Suddenly I See"	KT Tunstall	6	9 April	8	
19 March	"Straight Lines" (#4) ◁	Silverchair	1	19 March	11	
19 March	"Grace Kelly" (#7) ◁	Mika	2	9 April	15	
26 March	"What Goes Around... Comes Around" ◁	Justin Timberlake	3	25 March	4	
26 March	"20 Good Reasons" ◁	Thirsty Merc	4	28 May	13	
9 April	"Girlfriend" (#2) ◁	Avril Lavigne	1	16 April	17	
16 April	"Candyman" (#8) ◁	Christina Aguilera	2	7 May	17	
16 April	"Glamorous" ◁	Fergie featuring Ludacris	2	28 May	12	
23 April	"Beautiful Liar" ◁	Beyoncé and Shakira	4	23 April	4	
23 April	"Steer" ◁	Missy Higgins	1	23 April	3	
14 May	"Leave Me Alone (I'm Lonely)"	Pink	5	14 May	9	
14 May	"Makes Me Wonder" ◁	Maroon 5	6	21 May	9	
21 May	"Lost and Running" ◁	Powderfinger	5	21 May	2	
4 June	"Umbrella" (#3) ◁	Rihanna featuring Jay Z	1	4 June	13	
4 June	"Never Again" ◁	Kelly Clarkson	5	4 June	8	
4 June	"The Others"	TV Rock and Dukes of Windsor	10	4 June	1	
11 June	"If You Don't Mean It"	Dean Geyer	10	11 June	1	
18 June	"Opinions Won't Keep You Warm at Night" ◁	Kisschasy	10	18 June	1	
25 June	"Destination Calabria"	Alex Gaudino	3	9 July	11	
25 June	"Thnks fr th Mmrs"	Fall Out Boy	3	17 September	14	
2 July	"4 in the Morning" ◁	Gwen Stefani	9	2 July	1	
9 July	"Dance Floor Anthem (I Don't Want to Be in Love)" ◁	Good Charlotte	2	9 July	12	
16 July	"Big Girls Don't Cry" (#1) ◁	Fergie	1	16 July	14	
16 July	"Dear Mr. President" ◁	Pink featuring Indigo Girls	5	23 July	8	
16 July	"Don't Matter"	Akon	9	23 July	5	
30 July	"Love Today" ◁	Mika	3	27 August	8	
6 August	"When You're Gone" ◁	Avril Lavigne	4	27 August	7	
13 August	"Can't Touch It" ◁	Ricki-Lee	2	13 August	8	
13 August	"Where I Stood" ◁	Missy Higgins	10	13 August	1	
27 August	"Stronger" ◁	Kanye West	2	3 September	12	
3 September	"That's Gold" ◁	Paul Harragon	8	3 September	1	
10 September	"Loud" ◁	Shannon Noll	3	10 September	1	
10 September	"Shut Up and Drive" ◁	Rihanna	4	10 September	5	
10 September	"Ayo Technology" ◁	50 Cent featuring Justin Timberlake	10	10 September	1	
17 September	"Beautiful Girls" (#10) ◁	Sean Kingston	1	17 September	10	
17 September	"The Pretender" ◁	Foo Fighters	10	17 September	1	
24 September	"In This Life" ◁	Delta Goodrem	1	24 September	9	
24 September	"The Way I Are" ◁	Timbaland featuring Keri Hilson and D.O.E.	1	29 October	18	
24 September	"How Far We've Come" ◁	Matchbox Twenty	7	22 October	14	
1 October	"Hook Me Up" ◁	The Veronicas	1	12 November	10	
1 October	"Hey There Delilah"	Plain White T's	3	12 November	11	
8 October	"Don't You Wanna Feel" ◁	Rogue Traders	10	8 October	4	
15 October	"Gimme More" ◁	Britney Spears	3	15 October	5	
22 October	"Into the Night"	Santana featuring Chad Kroeger	4	26 November	15	
5 November	"Apologize" (#6) ◁	Timbaland featuring OneRepublic	1	26 November	17	
19 November	"2 Hearts" ◁	Kylie Minogue	1	19 November	3	
19 November	"Love Is All Around" ◁	Ricki-Lee	5	19 November	1	
26 November	"Clumsy"	Fergie	3	26 November	9	
26 November	"No One"	Alicia Keys	3	17 December	13	
3 December	"Here I Am" ◁	Natalie Gauci	2	3 December	4	
10 December	"Happy Ending"	Mika	7	10 December	8	
17 December	"Believe Again" ◁	Delta Goodrem	2	17 December	2	
17 December	"Untouched" ◁	The Veronicas	2	24 December	13	

=== 2006 peaks ===
List of ARIA top ten singles in 2007 that peaked in 2006
Top ten entry date	Single	Artist(s)	Peak	Peak date	Weeks in top ten	References
14 August	"I Wish I Was a Punk Rocker (With Flowers in My Hair)"	Sandi Thom	1	4 September	21	
18 September	"I Don't Feel Like Dancin'" ◁	Scissor Sisters	1	20 November	18	
20 November	"My Love" ◁	Justin Timberlake featuring T.I.	3	27 November	11	
4 December	"Night of My Life" ◁	Damien Leith	1	4 December	5	
11 December	"Don't Give Up" ◁	Shannon Noll and Natalie Bassingthwaighte	2	18 December	11	

=== 2008 peaks ===
List of ARIA top ten singles in 2007 that peaked in 2008
Top ten entry date	Single	Artist(s)	Peak	Peak date	Weeks in top ten	References
26 November	"Don't Hold Back"	The Potbelleez	5	28 January	12	
24 December	"Bleeding Love" ◁	Leona Lewis	1	21 January	17	

== Entries by artist ==
The following table shows artists who achieved two or more top 10 entries in 2007, including songs that reached their peak in 2006 and 2008. The figures include both main artists and featured artists. The total number of weeks an artist spent in the top ten in 2007 is also shown.

Entries	Artist	Weeks	Songs
4	Akon	27	"Don't Matter", "I Wanna Fuck You", "Smack That", "The Sweet Escape"
4	Fergie	37	"Big Girls Don't Cry", "Clumsy", "Fergalicious", "Glamorous"
3	Gwen Stefani	19	"4 in the Morning", "The Sweet Escape", "Wind It Up"
3	Justin Timberlake	10	"Ayo Technology", "My Love", "What Goes Around... Comes Around"
3	Mika	27	"Grace Kelly", "Happy Ending", "Love Today"
2	Avril Lavigne	24	"Girlfriend", "When You're Gone"
2	Beyoncé	10	"Beautiful Liar", "Irreplaceable"
2	Delta Goodrem	11	"Believe Again", "In This Life"
2	Fall Out Boy	26	"Thnks fr th Mmrs", "This Ain't a Scene, It's an Arms Race"
2	Good Charlotte	15	"Dance Floor Anthem (I Don't Want to Be in Love)", "Keep Your Hands off My Girl"
2	Missy Higgins	4	"Steer", "Where I Stood"
2	Pink	17	"Dear Mr. President", "Leave Me Alone (I'm Lonely)"
2	Ricki Lee	9	"Can't Touch It", "Love Is All Around"
2	Rihanna	18	"Shut Up and Drive", "Umbrella"
2	Shannon Noll	9	"Don't Give Up", "Loud"
2	Timbaland	15	"Apologize", "The Way I Are"
2	The Veronicas	13	"Hook Me Up", "Untouched"
