= Dance Floor Anthem (I Don't Want to Be in Love) =

2007 single by Good Charlotte

Single by Good Charlotte

from the album Good Morning Revival
- Released: June 25, 2007
- Studio: Armoury, The Warehouse (Vancouver, British Columbia); NRG (Los Angeles)
- Genre: Dance-rock
- Length: 4:04 (album version); 3:48 (radio mix)
- Label: Epic; Sony BMG; Daylight
- Songwriters: Joel Madden; Benji Madden; Don Gilmore
- Producer: Don Gilmore

Good Charlotte singles chronology
| "Break Apart Her Heart" (2007) | "Dance Floor Anthem" (2007) | "Misery" (2007) |

Music video
- "Dance Floor Anthem (I Don't Wanna Be in Love)" on YouTube

"Dance Floor Anthem (I Don't Wanna Be in Love)", known as "Dance Floor Anthem" on the album, is a song by American pop-punk band Good Charlotte on their fourth studio album, Good Morning Revival (2007). The song became the band's highest-charting single in Australia, reaching number two for three nonconsecutive weeks and earning a platinum certification. In the United States, the song peaked at number 25 on the Billboard Hot 100 and was certified double platinum.

== Music video ==
The video (directed by Sean Michael Turrell) begins in a shot of a beating heart on a TV monitor, and the shot becomes a small montage of the band in a party, and also in a white and orange corridor playing their instruments. This scene alternates with shots of Joel Madden and a woman in an elevator. When the chorus comes, the band appears in individual shots in the party. This turns into the band in the corridor again, and then into Madden's elevator buddy raging at him. The party scene, the corridor scene, a new scene of three nurses dancing in a vacant corridor, a new elevator scene and the TV heart breaking apart play throughout the chorus, and then the video turns into individual shots of the band playing in the elevator. These scenes alternate until the end.

== Chart performance ==
"Dance Floor Anthem" became the band's highest-charting song in Australia, debuting at number two on the ARIA Singles Chart on July 15, 2007. Throughout August and September, it rose and fell within the top five, logging two more weeks at number two. Afterwards, it fell down the chart, spending a further 21 weeks in the top 50. At the end of the year, the single came in at number 12 on the Australian year-end chart. The Australian Recording Industry Association (ARIA) awarded the single a platinum certification for shipping over 70,000 copies. In neighboring New Zealand, the song debuted at number 38 on August 13, then reached its peak of number 11 six weeks later, becoming the band's second-highest-charting single there after "I Just Wanna Live", which reached number six. It spent 26 weeks on the Recorded Music NZ (then RIANZ) chart altogether and was certified platinum for sales and streaming figures exceeding 30,000 units.

"Dance Floor Anthem" is the second-highest-peaking song of Good Charlotte's career on the US Billboard Hot 100, where it reached number 25. By January 2009, it had sold over two million copies in the US, enough to earn a double-platinum certification from the Recording Industry Association of America (RIAA). In Canada, the song reached number 35 on the Canadian Hot 100 chart. In Europe, it charted in Finland, where it debuted and peaked at number 19 on the seventh chart week of 2008 but dropped out of the chart the next week. It also appeared on Slovakia's chart, where it reached number 18 and spent 41 nonconsecutive weeks in the top 100.

== Track listings ==
"Dance Floor Anthem (I Don't Want to Be in Love)"
A sample of "Dance Floor Anthem (I Don't Want to Be in Love)", the third single released from Good Morning Revival.

US CD ringle

1. "I Don't Wanna Be in Love (Dance Floor Anthem)" – 4:04
2. "Keep Your Hands Off My Girl" (Brass Knuckles remix) – 3:26
3. "The River" (acoustic version) – 3:32
4. "I Don't Wanna Be in Love (Dance Floor Anthem)" (ringtone)

Australian CD single

1. "Dance Floor Anthem (I Don't Want to Be in Love)" (radio edit)
2. "Dance Floor Anthem (I Don't Want to Be in Love)" (album version)
3. "Keep Your Hands Off My Girl" (Brass Knuckles remix)

== Charts ==
=== Weekly charts ===
| Chart (2007–2008) | Peak position |
|---|---|
| Australia (ARIA) | 2 |
| Canada Hot 100 (Billboard) | 35 |
| CIS Airplay (TopHit) | 114 |
| Finland (Suomen virallinen lista) | 19 |
| Mexico Anglo (Monitor Latino) | 17 |
| New Zealand (Recorded Music NZ) | 11 |
| Slovakia Airplay (ČNS IFPI) | 18 |
| Ukraine Airplay (TopHit) | 189 |
| US Billboard Hot 100 | 25 |
| US Adult Pop Airplay (Billboard) | 21 |
| US Pop Airplay (Billboard) | 16 |

| Chart (2023) | Peak position |
|---|---|
| Germany Airplay (TopHit) | 182 |

=== Year-end charts ===
| Chart (2007) | Position |
|---|---|
| Australia (ARIA) | 12 |

== Certifications ==
| Region | Certification | Certified units/sales |
|---|---|---|
| Australia (ARIA) | Platinum | 70,000^{^} |
| New Zealand (RMNZ) | Platinum | 30,000^{‡} |
| United States (RIAA) | 2× Platinum | 2,000,000^{‡} |
^{^} Shipments figures based on certification alone.^{‡} Sales+streaming figures based on certification alone.
