= Burn It Down (Avenged Sevenfold song) =

Single by Avenged Sevenfold

from the album City of Evil
- Released: June 5, 2005
- Recorded: January 1 – April 18, 2005
- Studio: The Hobby Shop (Los Angeles); Ocean Way (Hollywood)
- Genre: Heavy metal; thrash metal; power metal
- Length: 4:59
- Label: Warner
- Songwriter: Avenged Sevenfold
- Producers: Andrew Murdock; Avenged Sevenfold; Fred Archambault

Avenged Sevenfold singles chronology
"Unholy Confessions" (2004)	"Burn It Down" (2005)	"Bat Country" (2005)

Music video
- "Burn It Down" on YouTube

"Burn It Down" is a song by American heavy metal band Avenged Sevenfold, the second track from their third studio album, City of Evil (2005). It was the first song to be written for the album. It was released as the lead single from the album on June 5, 2005, but was received poorly by fans. A live performance of the song was used for a music video. The video was directed by Nick Wickham. The song was featured on the compilation MTV's Headbangers Ball – The Revenge, as well as the soundtrack for Saw III.

== Track listing ==
CD
No.	Title	Length
1.	"Burn It Down"	4:59
2.	"Syn's Solo" (live)	2:23

== Personnel ==
Personnel listing as adapted from the album's liner notes.

Avenged Sevenfold

- M. Shadows – lead vocals, backing vocals
- Zacky Vengeance – rhythm guitar, co-lead guitar, backing vocals
- The Rev – drums, backing vocals
- Synyster Gates – lead guitar
- Johnny Christ – bass, backing vocals

Production

- Produced by Mudrock and Avenged Sevenfold, with additional production by Fred Archambault and Scott Gilman
- Mixed by Andy Wallace
- Pro Tools by John O'Mahony, assisted by Steve Sisco
- Mastered by Eddie Schreyer
- Additional vocal production by The Rev, Synyster Gates and M. Shadows
- Orchestration by Scott Gilman, The Rev, Synyster Gates and M. Shadows
- Drum tech – Mike Fasano
- Guitar tech – Stephen Ferrara-Grand

== Charts ==
Chart (2006–2008)	Peak position
UK Singles Chart	92
UK Rock	7
