= City of Evil =

Studio album by Avenged Sevenfold
- Released: June 6, 2005
- Recorded: January 1 – April 18, 2005
- Studios: The Hobby Shop (Los Angeles); Ocean Way (Hollywood)
- Genres: Heavy metal; progressive metal; power metal; thrash metal; hard rock
- Length: 72:43
- Labels: Warner Bros.; Hopeless
- Producer: Mudrock

Avenged Sevenfold chronology
Waking the Fallen (2003)	City of Evil (2005)	Avenged Sevenfold (2007)

Singles from City of Evil
- 1. "Burn It Down" Released: June 5, 2005; 2. "Bat Country" Released: August 9, 2005; 3. "Beast and the Harlot" Released: February 28, 2006; 4. "Seize the Day" Released: July 11, 2006

City of Evil is the third studio album by American heavy metal band Avenged Sevenfold, released on June 6, 2005, through Warner Bros. and Hopeless Records. Co-produced by Andrew Murdock, City of Evil contains a more traditional heavy metal and hard rock sound than Avenged Sevenfold's previous two albums, which showcased a predominantly metalcore sound. The album title is derived from a lyric in the song, "Beast and the Harlot". The album is notable for the absence of fry vocals. M. Shadows worked for months before the album's release with vocal coach Ron Anderson, whose clients have included Axl Rose and Chris Cornell, to achieve a sound that had "grit while still having the tone". In order to increase stamina and strength on the pedals, The Rev would sit for hours practicing until he could get up to 210 beats per minute.

The album contains some of Avenged Sevenfold's most popular and famous songs, including "Bat Country", which is arguably their most successful to date, being one of their two singles certified gold by the RIAA. City of Evil was very successful after its release, debuting at number 30 on the Billboard 200 chart and has been certified platinum by the RIAA in the United States and gold in both Canada and the United Kingdom. It went on to sell over 1,500,000 copies in the United States, and 2,500,000 total worldwide, making it the best-selling album out of Avenged Sevenfold's discography as of 2020. "Burn It Down", "Bat Country", "Beast and the Harlot" and "Seize the Day" were also released as music videos, directed by Marc Klasfeld, Tony Petrossian, and Wayne Isham, respectively. "Blinded in Chains" was featured in the video game Need for Speed: Most Wanted, and is the promo of the Japanese-Canadian anime Bakugan Battle Brawlers on TV3.

The album was ranked No. 63 on Guitar World magazine's "100 Greatest Guitar Albums of All Time". City of Evil also appears in Kerrang!'s "666 Albums You Must Hear Before You Die" and "50 Albums You Need to Hear Before You Die". The album was ranked No. 35 in Kerrang's list of "50 Greatest Metal Albums Ever" in 2016. Rolling Stone listed the album at No. 100 on its list of The 100 Greatest Metal Albums of All Time.

== Background and release ==
Previously, Avenged Sevenfold had written and released two albums, Sounding the Seventh Trumpet in 2001 and Waking the Fallen in 2003, under the Goodlife Records and the Hopeless Records labels, respectively. Although neither album was a smash hit, the latter has been certified platinum by the RIAA as of 2021. Waking the Fallen attracted several major record labels to the band, and eventually they signed with Warner Bros. Records after consideration of several others.

Shadows turned to Ron Anderson, a vocal coach that had previously worked with Axl Rose and Chris Cornell. Shadows was specifically looking to add a more gritty, raspy tone to his voice and worked with Anderson for several months on this before City of Evil was recorded. This change resulted in newly established vocal contributions from each band member during live performances, and remained prevalent on every record the band has released since 2005.

"Ron taught me how to have that grit to my voice while still having the tone. He brought all of that to the table and he brought that technique to my voice. I’ve worked with him for about a year and a half now, but I worked with him for nine months before the record," said Shadows, "I told him that I want my voice to sound different from everybody else, but I wanted those characteristics in my voice...It was one of those things that we just wanted to go all the way with it."

Rumors were spread that Shadows had lost his ability to scream due to throat surgery needed after Warped Tour 2003. However, producer Andrew Murdock put down these rumors by saying: "When I met band after Sounding the Seventh Trumpet… Matt handed me the CD, and he said to me, 'This record's screaming. The record we want to make is going to be half-screaming and half-singing. I don't want to scream anymore… the record after that is going to be all singing.'"

The album was recorded in what Zacky Vengeance described as "literally in the middle of the fucking worst ghetto in Los Angeles." He recalled: "We couldn't even walk outside of the studio without fear of getting shot and we're there for 14, 15 hours a day, nothing to do but work on these songs and drive home at midnight to our parents' houses. And at 6 o'clock in the morning, get up and do it again. [....] We went over everything until there was nothing left to give, fucking exhausted ourselves writing that album. It wasn't a fun experience. It was literally working so fucking hard, because it was our one chance."

"Burn It Down" was the first track written for "City of Evil". The song was released as the lead single from the album, but was received poorly by fans. M. Shadows recalled: "I remember, like, Thrice was a band that we kind of were even with at that time — they were probably bigger than us for sure, but [...] I remember going on their message board and seeing everyone's laughing at us. They're going, "This is so bad, it's laughable." And I was just like sitting there going, 'Wow, really?' [...] At the time, it was just so natural for us to go there, but to them, it was like a slap in the face, this high screaming, and it's like fucking Helloween meets Sonata Arctica, but American style. And so I was like, How is this? Like, maybe it needs a different audience, I don't know what. People hated what we had done." He stated his belief that some longtime fans who felt alienated by the band's stylistic change were eventually won back over after the album received endorsement from Dream Theater drummer Mike Portnoy.

"Bat Country" was one of the breakout singles of 2005, reaching No. 2 on the Billboard Hot Mainstream Rock Tracks, No. 6 on the Billboard Modern Rock Tracks, and No. 1 on MTV's Total Request Live. "Trashed and Scattered" was released after "Burn It Down", and was also received poorly.

== Composition and music ==
The sound on City of Evil has been described as "absolutely rife with the imagery and pacing of classic metal," and according to Johnny Loftus of AllMusic, the influence from the New Wave of British Heavy Metal is immediately apparent. Abandoning the metalcore sound present on the band's first two albums, Avenged Sevenfold instead opted to draw stylistic cues from their early influences. Frontman M. Shadows assessed in an interview: "When we started working on this record, we said, 'You know what? None of our favorite bands are super extreme, they just write really good melodic songs that are still heavy." Music journalists have described City of Evil musically as heavy metal, progressive metal, hard rock, thrash metal, and power metal. The album is partially influenced by European power metal bands such as Blind Guardian, Sonata Arctica and Helloween, as well as Children of Bodom. M. Shadows stated that the band attempted to outdo Children of Bodom musically during this time. He explained: "Like, we want to fucking play guitar like that but be an American-style band but have those Euro elements. And so we took everything from Dream Theater to Pantera and Metallica to Children of Bodom to Blind Guardian to Queen to everything, and that's what's mixed into that record, just it's insanity, everything's too fast but it's awesome, you know?"

Drummer The Rev's drum work on the album has been described as "maniacally rippling," and lead guitarist Synyster Gates' lead guitar lines have been described as "triumphantly whining." The album features trade off guitar solos between Gates and rhythm guitarist Zacky Vengeance. The verse riffs on the album's second track "Burn It Down" have drawn comparisons to Metallica. The album's fourth track "Bat Country" fuses punk rock and pop influences, drawing comparison to My Chemical Romance. The album's eighth track "The Wicked End" incorporates cello and choral elements.

The album's penultimate track "Betrayed" is a tribute to Dimebag Darrell, the late guitarist of Pantera.

The album features longer song forms compared to the band's previous releases. Zacky Vengeance assessed: "We didn't take the easy way. We wrote songs that should never ever end up on MTV, never ever end up on the radio. Every song was way too long, and we know that there wasn't going to be any good edits for any of those songs, but we were still like, 'This is our one big chance.'"

== Artwork ==
According to Johnny Loftus of AllMusic, the album's cover artwork depicts "a skeletal swordsman flying a steed with steaming nostrils over the urban inferno of the title; tattoos [and] demons." According to him, the album's liner notes are decorated with the band's deathbat symbol, which he describes as a "skull with flapping wings."

== Music videos ==
City of Evil features four music videos (one for each single). On June 2, 2005, the band released a promotional video for "Burn It Down", which was done in the same way as "Unholy Confessions" from Waking the Fallen (live footage with dubbed music). The video was directed by Nick Wickham. On July 28, 2005, their first professional video for a song on the album, "Bat Country", was released. It was directed by Marc Klasfeld. On February 6, 2006, "Beast and the Harlot" was released. This was a few weeks after it had been leaked on YouTube. It was directed by Tony Petrossian. On June 30, 2006, the music video for Seize the Day was released on Avenged Sevenfold's MySpace and YouTube. The video was directed by Wayne Isham.

== Reception ==
Professional ratings
Review scores
Source	Rating
AllMusic	3.5/5 stars
Blender	4/5 stars
IGN	7.9/10
Metal Hammer	4/5 stars
Punknews.org	3/5 stars
Rolling Stone	3/5 stars
Sputnikmusic	4.5/5

The album debuted at No. 30 on the Billboard 200, selling over 30,000 copies.

Critical reception to the album was generally positive. Rolling Stone praised the guitar work, giving the album three out of a possible five stars. Johnny Loftus of AllMusic rated the album three-and-a-half stars out of five, saying that the album's experimentation is "all totally metal, and refreshingly unmarred by attempts to fit too many jumbled genres in. [...] Avenged Sevenfold gets all the pieces right, and sound like they're having more fun here than in the scattershot approach of the first couple records." British magazine Metal Hammer gave the album an eight out of ten rating with Katie Parsons concluding "They have done it their way, they're having fun and who the hell can blame them?".

In addition, "Bat Country" was one of the breakout singles of 2005, reaching No. 2 on the Billboard Hot Mainstream Rock Tracks, No. 6 on the Billboard Modern Rock Tracks, and No. 1 on MTV's Total Request Live. Additionally, the band won Best New Artist at the 2006 MTV Video Music Awards, beating out Rihanna, Panic! at the Disco, James Blunt, Angels & Airwaves and Chris Brown.

== Track listing ==
All songs credited to Avenged Sevenfold, registered to Matthew Sanders, Brian Haner Jr., Zachary Baker and James Sullivan.

No.	Title	Length
1.	"Beast and the Harlot"	5:42
2.	"Burn It Down"	5:00
3.	"Blinded in Chains"	6:34
4.	"Bat Country"	5:13
5.	"Trashed and Scattered"	5:53
6.	"Seize the Day"	5:35
7.	"Sidewinder"	7:01
8.	"The Wicked End"	7:10
9.	"Strength of the World"	9:14
10.	"Betrayed"	6:47
11.	"M.I.A."	8:48
Total length:		72:42

== Personnel ==
Personnel listing as adapted from album liner notes:

Avenged Sevenfold

- M. Shadows – vocals
- Zacky Vengeance – rhythm guitar, co-lead guitar, backing vocals, acoustic guitar on "Seize the Day", gang vocals on "Strength of the World"
- The Rev – drums, backing vocals, piano on "Seize the Day", gang vocals on "Strength of the World"
- Synyster Gates – lead guitar, backing vocals, piano on "Beast and the Harlot" and "Sidewinder", gang vocals on "Strength of the World"
- Johnny Christ – bass, backing vocals, gang vocals on "Strength of the World"

Production

- Produced by Mudrock and Avenged Sevenfold, with additional production by Fred Archambault and Scott Gilman
- Mixed by Andy Wallace
- Pro Tools by John O'Mahony, assisted by Steve Sisco
- Mastered by Eddie Schreyer
- Additional vocal production by Synyster Gates and M. Shadows
- Orchestration by Scott Gilman, Synyster Gates and M. Shadows
- Drum tech – Mike Fasano
- Guitar tech – Stephen Ferrara-Grand

Session musicians

- Brian Haner – additional guitars, pedal steel guitar, acoustic guitar solo left on "Sidewinder"

Orchestra

- Violinists – Samuel Fischer (soloist), Mark Robertson, Songa Lee-Kitto, Sam Formicola, Bruce Dukov, Alan Grunfeld, Larry Greenfield, Liane Mautner
- Violists – David Walther, Matthew Funes, Alma Fernandez
- Cellists – Victor Lawrence (soloist), David Low, David Mergen

Choir

- Choir leader – Jeannine Wagner
- Choir performers – Zachary Biggs, Colton Beyer-Johnson, Josiah Yiu, Nathan Cruz, Stephen Cruz, C.J. Cruz, Sean Sullivan, Alan Hong, Nico Walsh, Sally Stevens

== In other media ==
Multiple City of Evil songs appeared in video games, notably by Electronic Arts and Activision. "Bat Country" appeared in EA Sports' Madden 06 and NHL 06, as well as SSX On Tour, which was produced by EA Sports label EA Sports BIG. It also appeared in Saints Row 2, Guitar Hero: Warriors of Rock, Rocksmith 2014, and both in the movie Big Momma's House 2 and the TV show Bones, respectively. However, the lyric "too many doses" has been replaced by "too many save me" to avoid drug content in a few games to keep the ESRB age rating down below. "Blinded in Chains" is featured in Need For Speed: Most Wanted where it is the theme song for Blacklist member #14 Vince "Taz" Killic. "Beast and the Harlot" was featured in the soundtrack of the games Burnout Revenge, Guitar Hero II, Guitar Hero Smash Hits, Rock Band 3. and Rocksmith. The version featured in Guitar Hero II was a cover version, while the one featured in Smash Hits was a master recording.

== Charts ==
=== Weekly charts ===
Chart (2005–2006)	Peak position
Australian Hitseekers Albums (ARIA)	8
Canadian Albums (Nielsen SoundScan)	55
Japanese Albums (Oricon)	16
New Zealand Heatseekers Albums (RIANZ)	1
Scottish Albums (Official Charts)	70
UK Albums (Official Charts)	63
UK Rock & Metal Albums (Official Charts)	4
US Billboard 200	30
US Top Rock Albums (Billboard)	13

=== Year-end charts ===
Chart (2006)	Position
US Billboard 200	152

== Certifications ==
Region	Certification	Certified units/sales
Canada (Music Canada)	Gold	50,000^{^}
United Kingdom (BPI)	Gold	100,000^{^}
United States (RIAA)	Platinum	1,000,000^{^}
^{^} Shipments figures based on certification alone.
