= Good Morning Revival =

Studio album by Good Charlotte
- Released: March 27, 2007
- Recorded: July – September 2006
- Studio: Armoury & The Warehouse Studios (Vancouver, Canada); NRG Recording Studios (Los Angeles, California)
- Genre: Dance-punk; dance-rock; pop rock; pop-punk; alternative rock; emo pop
- Length: 44:55
- Label: Epic; Daylight
- Producer: Don Gilmore

Good Charlotte chronology
The Chronicles of Life and Death (2004)	Good Morning Revival (2007)	Cardiology (2010)

Singles from Good Morning Revival
- 1. "The River" Released: January 15, 2007; 2. "Keep Your Hands off My Girl" Released: February 23, 2007; 3. "Dance Floor Anthem" Released: June 30, 2007; 4. "Misery" Released: December 7, 2007; 5. "Where Would We Be Now" Released: May 20, 2008

Good Morning Revival is the fourth album by the American rock band Good Charlotte, released on March 27, 2007 through Epic and Daylight Records. The band began working on new material in early 2005, however, drummer Chris Wilson soon left the band and was replaced by Dean Butterworth. The group took a break to focus on their personal lives before reconvening in early 2006, and eventually reconnecting with producer Don Gilmore. He was dismissive of the new material that the band showed him, and on his recommendation Benji and Joel Madden left Los Angeles, California and settled in Vancouver, Canada. After writing a number of new songs there, the brothers felt they were heading in the right direction. Meeting up every two weeks, the band members showed off the songs they were working on; Gilmore was again dismissive, challenging them to write material that was different. Another batch of songs was written before recording began in July 2006 and concluded in September.

Featuring heavy use of keyboards, played by guitarist Billy Martin, most of the material is credited to the Madden brothers and Gilmore. Overall comparisons were made to the Killers and A Flock of Seagulls, with individual aspects of songs resembling works by the Rapture, t.A.T.u. and Underworld, among others. Early 2007 saw the debut of music videos, and single releases, for "Keep Your Hands off My Girl" and "The River" in January and February. "Dance Floor Anthem" was released as a single in June, and was followed by a tour supporting Justin Timberlake. The band then embarked on an Australian tour and released "Misery" as a single in December. Another single, "Where Would We Be Now", was released in May 2008 and preceded the band's co-headlining US tour with Boys Like Girls that summer.

Good Morning Revival received a mixed reception from critics, some of whom praised the band's hooks and choruses. It sold 66,000 copies in its first week, debuting at number seven on the Billboard 200 in the process. As of July 2010, sales stood at 314,000 copies sold. Outside the US, the album reached the top 10 in New Zealand, Australia, Canada, Switzerland, Austria and Germany, as well as the top 30 in the UK, Finland, Sweden, Italy and France. Within these territories, the album was certified platinum in Australia, and gold in Canada and New Zealand, and silver in the UK. "The River" and "Dance Floor Anthem" were successful on the US radio charts, and both reached the top 40 on the Hot 100. "Keep Your Hands off My Girl" charted within the top 10 in Australia and Finland and reached the top 40 across various European countries. "Keep Your Hands off My Girl" was certified gold in Australia, while "Dance Floor Anthem" was certified platinum in Australia and the US.

== Background ==
In March 2005, the band went on a UK tour during which they worked on new material on their tour bus. Vocalist Joel Madden expressed an interest in moving beyond the three-chord song structures used in the songs on The Chronicles of Life and Death. Guitarist Billy Martin had kept this in mind while writing the majority of the material. At this point, Madden reckoned they had anywhere from a quarter to half an album's worth of songs. In May, drummer Chris Wilson left the group and was replaced by Dean Butterworth. The band had met him through Goldfinger frontman John Feldmann. In August, the band revealed they would be recording later in the year with producer Eric Valentine. Madden said he had been revisiting the music of acts he used to enjoy, such as Oasis, the Police and the Clash. He also mentioned that keyboards, played by Martin, would feature heavily on the new songs.

At this point, they had written 12 songs, and planned to go into pre-production in November and record in December. Instead, they took a break to focus on their personal lives. Martin worked on painting while the Madden brothers spent time producing other acts and DJing. They eventually got the urge to work again and reconvened in February 2006. The band reconnected with Don Gilmore, who produced their first album, and showed him the 50 songs they had written. Gilmore was dismissive of all the material except for "Keep Your Hands off My Girl".

Dave Massey, executive vice president of A&R at Sony Music Labels Group, and Gilmore proposed that they reinvent themselves, a view the Madden brothers shared. Massey said: "[They] wrote some very promising early songs, but both Don and myself really wanted to push the envelop as to what could be achieved". Gilmore suggested that the Madden brothers needed to escape from the Los Angeles scene to focus on the songs, and recommended they go to Vancouver, Canada. Vancouver's picturesque environment was an inspiration, and over the course of seven weeks they wrote a new batch of songs. The group were anxious and scared about impressing Gilmore; after they had written "Victims of Love", Joel Madden said they "felt like 'OK, now we're definitely on to something new and different'". Collectively, they spent two months in Canada before returning home.

== Recording ==
Every two weeks, the band would get together and play each other the songs they had written. They made demos of all the songs they liked, eventually recording around 40 from the Madden brothers, 12 from Martin and five from bassist Paul Thomas. They were sent in batches of ten to Gilmore, who would often respond saying he only liked one of the tracks. Gilmore challenged the band to write new material that was different. The group had demoed another 30 songs before they began recording their final choices in July. The band had met previously with a number of producers, but eventually went with Gilmore because of his helpful comments on the demos.

Sessions took place at Armoury Studios and The Warehouse in Vancouver, and at NRG Recording Studios in Los Angeles, California. Recording was handled by Mark Kiczula with assistant engineer Fox Phelps. Martin used his Paul Reed Smith guitar for three-quarters of the recording; for the rest of the album he used a John 5 Telecaster. The guitars were played through Mesa Boogie Dual Rectifiers heads connected to Marshall speaker cabinets. He used an Eventide H3000 Harmonizer effects pedal on nearly all the songs. Benji Madden played an Ernie Ball bass running through JCM heads connected to Marshall cabinets.

The band were talking to Avenged Sevenfold during the MTV Video Music Awards and invited them to the studio to hear the album. Joel Madden asked if they wanted to appear on a song and picked "The River". M. Shadows lent his vocals, and Synyster Gates contributed a guitar solo to the track. Bobbie Page, Terry Wood, Maxine Waters and Carmen Carter sing backing vocals on "All Black". The Incognito Horns play on "Broken Hearts Parade". BC Smith and Bart Hendrickson did the programming. Sessions concluded on September 14, and the recordings were sent for mixing three days later. They were mixed by Andy Wallace at Soundtrack Studios in New York City. John O'Mahony served as Pro Tools engineer with assistance from Mike Scielzi. Ted Jensen mastered the recordings at Sterling Sound in New York City.

== Composition ==
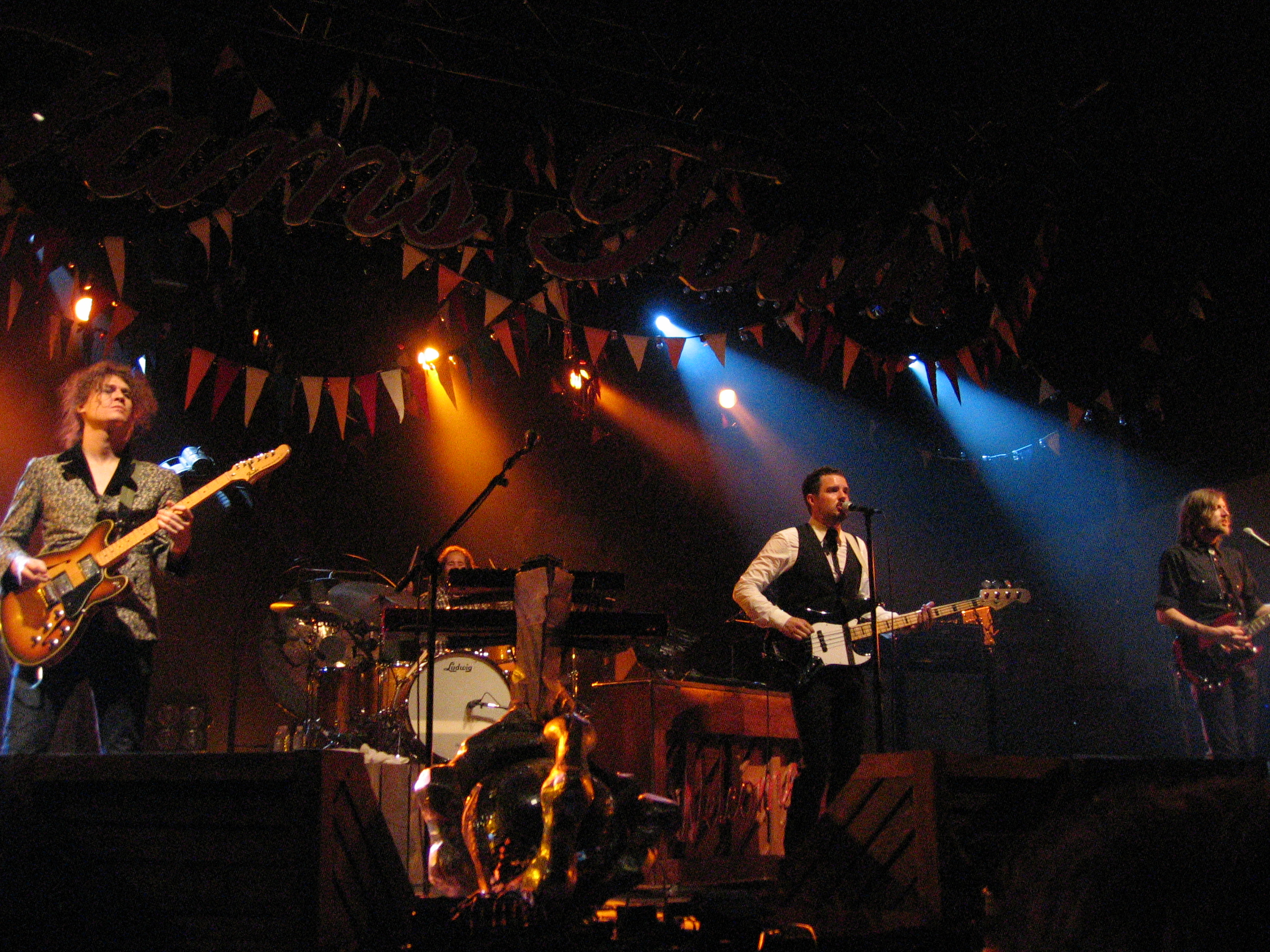
Comparisons were drawn to the Killers (pictured) by music critics

=== Overview ===
According to Joel Madden, the group wanted to move away from the dark overtones of their past work as they found their contemporaries' music was becoming "really dramatic". They decided to move into dance-orientated territory, incorporating hip-hop and dance elements into their pop-punk sound, and borrowed guitar effects from U2 guitarist The Edge. The album's sound has been classed as dance-punk, dance-rock and pop rock, with elements of new wave, pop-punk and rock. It drew comparisons to the Killers, the Bravery and A Flock of Seagulls. The album features a heavy use of keyboards compared to The Chronicles of Life and Death. According to Martin, they toyed with keyboards a bit on Chronicles, which everyone enjoyed. As a result, when writing for the new album, Martin would work on an idea with a keyboard instead of his guitar.

The Madden brothers had used their downtime from the band to DJ various events. Benji Madden said this was influential to the dance-y nature of the album, since the brothers were aware of how people were moving to the music. Joel Madden said Butterworth was important to the making of the album because he was from a "different school" of drumming. Martin said that Benji Madden came up with the name for the record, which he regarded as a "fresh kind of starting over". All the songs on the album are credited to Benji and Joel Madden and Don Gilmore, except for "Keep Your Hands off My Girl", credited to the Madden brothers, and "Where Would We Be Now", credited to Martin and the Madden brothers. The group retained three tracks from the initial pile of demos before involving Gilmore.

=== Songs ===
"The River"
A sample of "The River", the first single from Good Morning Revival. It features M. Shadows and Synyster Gates, members of Avenged Sevenfold.

"Dance Floor Anthem"
The chorus of "Dance Floor Anthem", the third single released from Good Morning Revival. It showcases a musical expansion from the band's prior works: 1980s-esque synthesizer parts combined with guitar chugs, which shifted into "fist-pumping" choruses.

"Good Morning Revival" opens the album and acts as a sound collage before transitioning into "Misery". Gilmore's production work on the first two Linkin Park records is evident in the guitar licks on this track, which recalled their Meteora album. Discussing the track, Madden said they lived in a "world full of distraction, and no one is supposed to be sad or feel anything but great and happy and do whatever it takes to be happy". "The River" features M. Shadows and Synyster Gates, members of Avenged Sevenfold, marking the first time the band had collaborated with another artist. The track is reminiscent of Alkaline Trio and makes numerous references to the Bible. It talks about people who get involved in the lifestyle of Los Angeles and lose their identity as a result. Electro-disco track "Dance Floor Anthem" is reminiscent of the Rapture; Madden said it is a break-up song that encourages someone to "[g]et out there and meet somebody, have a good time. ... Forget about it. Don't buy into the drama".

The Gorillaz-lite, pseudo-rapping "Keep Your Hands off My Girl" was inspired by DJ Junior Sanchez, a friend of Madden's who taught him about DJ and dance culture. Madden had intended for Sanchez to release the song, however, it was included on the album after people said positive things about it. It makes reference to clothing companies and artists such as Louis Vuitton, ASG, YSL and the Game. The song's distorted vocal track echoes the one used on Underworld's "Born Slippy". Dance-funk tune "Victims of Love" cribs heavily from the t.A.T.u. track "All the Things She Said", and employs a similar robotic vocal effect used by Cher on "Believe". Discussing "Where Would We Be Now", "Break Apart Her Heart" and "Something Else", Joel Madden said that love was a huge "part of me and I've accepted that and it's in my music. And I'm not afraid to just show it".

The piano in "Where Would We Be Now" was compared to that heard on Coldplay's "Clocks", though Martin said he was influenced by Muse. Martin moved into a new residence and found there was room for a piano. He subsequently got one and decided to write a song, resulting in "Where Would We Be Now". "All Black" opens with the sound of a pipe organ before the rest of the band joins in, toying with goth rock in the process. Country-leaning "Beautiful Place" was written by Benji Madden while he was in Mexico during hurricane season. When Butterworth laid down a drum track for it, the drums became part of the hook. "Something Else" and "Broken Hearts Parade" both sound closer to that of the group's older material. "Something Else" recalls Fountains of Wayne with its call-and-response vocals and the underlying Moog synthesizer. "Broken Hearts Parade" incorporates a horn section, which Martin was stubborn about including. "March On" is a crooning ballad, which Madden said was partially inspired by the Cardigans' "Lovefool".

== Release ==
In mid-September 2006, "Keep Your Hands off My Girl" was posted on the group's website. On October 28, 2006, a music video was released for the track. In December, the group filmed a music video for "The River" in Los Angeles, California, with director Marc Webb. It features the Los Angeles River, which Benji Madden said was symbolic in that "it's concrete, polluted, graffitied, and when you think of 'baptism in the river' [the chorus of the song], you think peaceful and serene". On December 18, 2006, Good Morning Revival was announced for release in three months' time. "The River" was released to radio on January 15, 2007, and was followed the next day by a music video for "Keep Your Hands off My Girl", which was directed by Marvin Scott Jarrett. A music video for "The River" premiered on TV on February 5. It features performance scenes next to the Los Angeles river, interspersed with footage of other places in Los Angeles. To promote the video, the band partnered with Bix.com to create a web portal that allowed their fans to upload pictures that could be incorporated in the video's background. These customized clips could then be sent to friends and appear on social networking platforms. "Keep Your Hands off My Girl" was released as a CD single in Australia on February 24 with a Broken Spindles remix, a music video of the track, an acoustic version of "I Just Wanna Live" and "Face the Strange" as B-sides.

Good Morning Revival was made available for streaming through AOL Music on March 26, and was released the following day through Epic and Daylight Records. Physical retailers, such as Target, Best Buy, Circuit City and Walmart, were each given exclusive bonus tracks, as was digital retailer iTunes. The Australian edition featured a DVD, which included "The River" music, a making-of video and an electronic press kit (EPK). An acoustic version of "March On" was available as a free download through the band's website. "Dance Floor Anthem" was released as a CD single in Australia on June 30 with radio and album versions of the song and a Brass Knuckles remix of "Keep Your Hands off My Girl" as B-sides. Also included was the music video for "Dance Floor Anthem", which was filmed in Canada and directed by Sean Michael Turrell. "Misery" was released as a CD single in Australia on December 7 with a live version of the track as a B-side. "Where Would We Be Now" was released to US radio on May 20, 2008. Benji Madden posted an outtake "No Communication" from the album sessions on their website in May 2009. In September 2010, the album was reissued as a two-CD package with The Chronicles of Life and Death.

== Touring ==
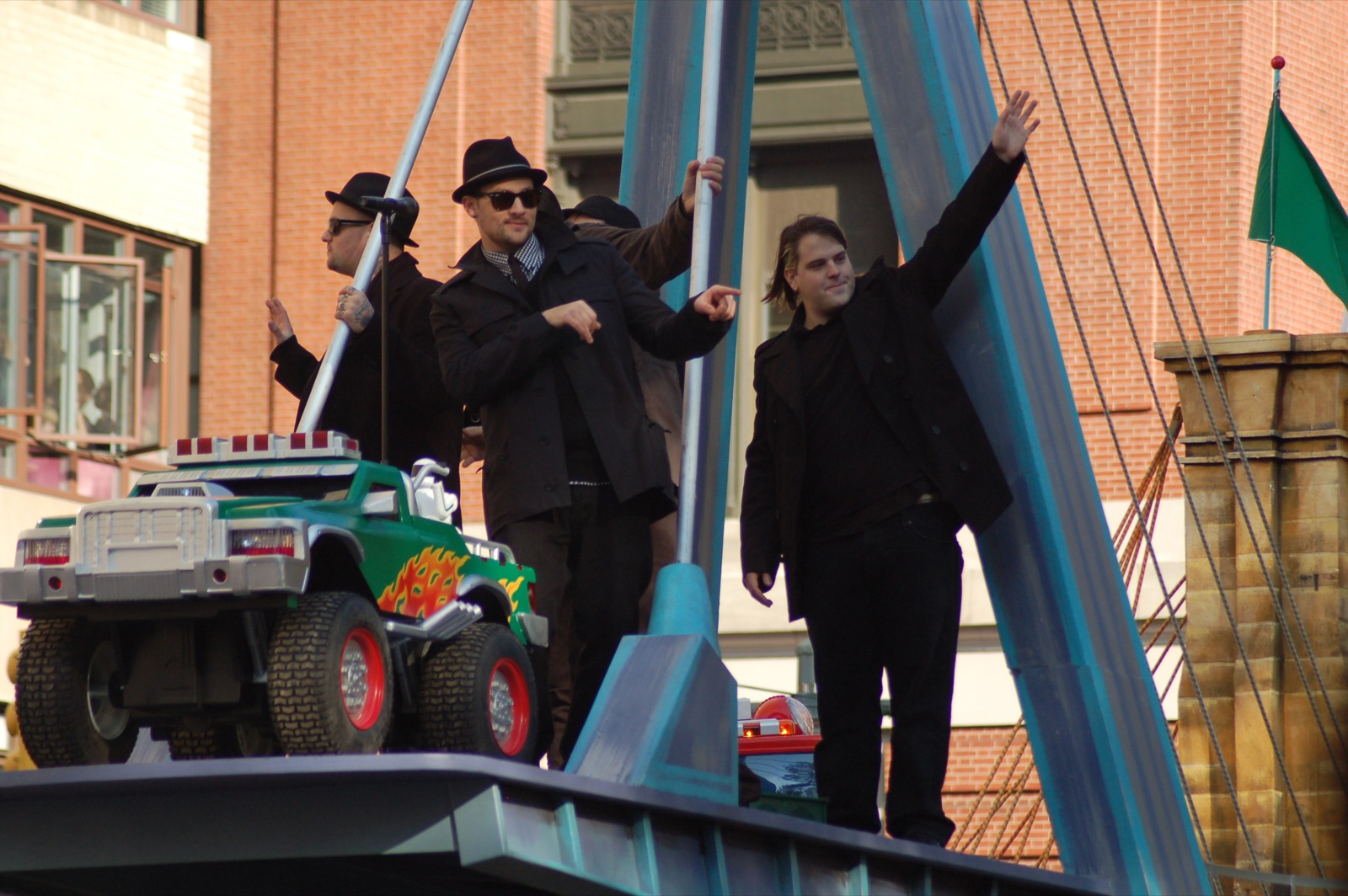
Good Charlotte in the Macy's Thanksgiving Day Parade in 2007

In September and October 2006, the group went on a headlining club tour with the Pink Spiders. In January 2007, the Madden brothers went on a promotional South Pacific tour. In April, the band appeared on The Tonight Show with Jay Leno, Jimmy Kimmel Live! and The Late Late Show with Craig Ferguson in the US, and at the MTV Awards in Australia. Following this, the group embarked on a tour of Japan and then Europe in May, which continued into June. The band supported Justin Timberlake on the US leg of his FutureSex/LoveShow tour in August and September. Alongside the tour, the band did a handful of in-store performances and signings, and an appearance on Live with Regis and Kelly. In October, the group went on a tour of Australia, and appeared in a television commercial for The Kyle & Jackie O Show. The band then performed in the 81st Macy's Thanksgiving Day Parade in 2007.

While in Australia, Thomas fell and sustained an ankle and foot injury. As a result, planned shows in Mexico were cancelled. They returned to the US and played on The Late Late Show with Craig Ferguson. In November and December, they performed at a series of radio festivals. In March and April 2008, the band played two shows in South Africa before going on a tour of Europe. A handful of US shows followed in April and May. The band were due to perform at the Groezrock festival in May, but had to cancel. In July and August, the group went on a co-headlining US tour with Boys Like Girls, with support from Metro Station and the Maine, dubbed the Soundtrack of Your Summer tour. Following this, the band performed at the Summer Krush and Summerset Music festivals in September.

== Reception ==
Professional ratings
Aggregate scores
Source	Rating
Metacritic	45/100
Review scores
Source	Rating
AllMusic	2/5 stars
Alternative Press	2/5 stars
Blender	3/5 stars
Drowned in Sound	5/10
Entertainment Weekly	B−
The Guardian	1/5 stars
musicOMH	4/5 stars
NME	3/10
Q	2/5 stars
Rolling Stone	2/5 stars

=== Critical response ===
Good Morning Revival has received generally mixed reviews, according to review aggregator Metacritic. About.com writer Daniel Wolfe said the band's decision to ape the Killers made the record "sound a little less gloomy". AllMusic reviewer Stephen Thomas Erlewine viewed the album as "desperate trend-chasing", piggybacking on two trends that rose to prominence since the band's 2002 breakthrough album: "dance-punk and '80s fetishism". In a review for Blender, music critic Andy Greenwald said the album was full of "Disney-channel-ready pop" that was "buffed and Pro-Tooled almost beyond recognition". Mike Haydock of Drowned in Sound said the record was "about as punk rock as the ironed-in creases on David Cameron's jeans", and that purchasing the album was "both pointless and foolish". The Guardian's Ian Gittins found the band swapping "grunge-lite punk-pop" for a "sleek angst-rock that would be rejected from the soundtrack of The OC for lack of emotional depth".

Tom Sinclair of Entertainment Weekly wrote that a greater emphasis was put on "infectious choruses and razor-sharp melodic hooks". Though the "cannily constructed" tracks might not "change anyone's life" ... "they sound good enough to almost convince you they mean something". musicOMH's Alex Nunn noted that while there was a "cavalcade of saccharine hooks and uber-large choruses", the album basically amounted to the band "doing what they've always done ... and in the case of Revival, they do it as well as ever". The New York Times reviewer Kelefa Sanneh called it "a mystifyingly inept CD that includes some of the worst lyrics you will — or, with any luck, won't — hear all year". NME writer Mike Sterry dismissed the group's intention of a "complete reinvention" as the record was "still unmistakably Good Charlotte: vile, goth-jock pop with all the wit and nuance of a urine-soaked sock".

Now's Evan Davies said that after several years of "hating every ounce" of Good Charlotte, "it seems now that the actual trick to enjoying their music on any plausible level is to go into the whole thing with absolutely no expectations. Not even low expectations. Nothing." Orange County Register writer Ben Wener remarked that it was "exceptionally crafted", flaunting "its money, studio expertise and synthetic window dressing in just about every air-tight sonic turn". Music critic Robert Christgau simply gave the album a "dud" rating. Christian Hoard of Rolling Stone found the tracks "dark and sour", saying "shimmery electronics and some tortured emo choruses" abound. The "jumpier rhythms help", and the band "still know how to write a hook". Spin writer Trevor Kelly said the album had a "few clunk dance tracks", but Madden's "search for love in the L.A. wasteland" provides it with "a certain charm". Sputnikmusic staff member Dave de Sylvia said the record was "inconsistent; downright sinful at times", with glances of "brilliance and some very creditable pop moments".

=== Commercial performance ===
Good Morning Revival debuted at number seven on the Billboard 200 with 66,000 copies sold in its first week. As of July 2010, the album had sold 314,000 copies in the US. It appeared on three additional Billboard charts: number two on the Top Rock Albums chart, number three on the Digital Albums chart, and number 10 on the Internet Albums chart. Outside of the US, the album charted at: number two in New Zealand, number five in Australia, number two in Canada and Switzerland, number 10 in Austria and Germany, number 13 in the UK, number 16 in Finland, number 23 in Sweden, number 32 in Italy, number 38 in France, and number 58 in the Netherlands. It was certified silver in the UK, gold in Canada and New Zealand, and platinum in Australia.

"The River" charted in the US at number 26 on the Digital Song Sales chart, number 38 on the Alternative Songs chart, and number 39 on the Hot 100 chart. Outside the US, it charted at: number 23 in Denmark, number 37 in Austria, number 40 in Germany, and number 108 in the UK. "Keep Your Hands off My Girl" charted at: number five in Australia, number nine in Finland, number 12 in Italy, number 20 in New Zealand, number 23 in the UK, number 27 in Switzerland, number 29 in Austria, number 32 in Germany, and number 49 in Sweden. It was certified gold in Australia. "Dance Floor Anthem" charted in the US at: number two on the Bubbling Under Hot 100 chart, number 13 on the Digital Song Sales chart, number 16 on the Mainstream Top 40 chart, number 21 on the Adult Top 40 chart, number 25 on the Hot 100 chart, number 33 on the Rock Digital Song Sales chart, and number 57 on the Radio Songs chart. Outside the US, it charted at number two in Australia, number 11 in New Zealand, and number 19 in Finland. It was certified platinum in Australia and the US. "Misery" charted at number 24 in Australia.

=== Legacy ===
Entertainment Weekly placed the album at number four on their list of the worst albums of 2007. Five tracks were remixed for inclusion on the band's Greatest Remixes (2008) compilation: "Broken Hearts Parade" (by Marshall Arts and featured Philieano and Tabi Bonney), "Keep Your Hands off My Girl" (by Dead Executives and featured Jung Tru and Bubba Sparxxx), "All Black" (by the White Tie Affair and featured Mat Devine of Kill Hannah), "Dance Floor Anthem" (covered by Metro Station) and "Where Would We Be Now" (by Troublemaker). The iTunes deluxe edition includes four additional remixes: "Misery" (by Steve Aoki), "The River" (by Apoptygma Berzerk), "Broken Hearts Parade" (by Vanderbilt and featured Prophit) and "Victims of Love" (by PBX).

"The River", "Keep Your Hands off My Girl", "Dance Floor Anthem" and "Misery" are included on the band's Greatest Hits (2010) compilation. In 2016, Benji Madden said of the album: "This was when we either could have quit or do what we did. ... We could have tried to make The Young And The Hopeless again, but that, to me, would have been giving up." Later that year, Joel Madden said it was his favorite Good Charlotte album, and that "people don't give it the credit it needs, as a record and for where we were at for our age. I think we really put together a body of work that was cohesive."

== Track listing ==
All songs by Benji Madden, Joel Madden and Don Gilmore, except where noted.

1. "Good Morning Revival" – 0:56
2. "Misery" – 3:49
3. "The River" (featuring M. Shadows & Synyster Gates) – 3:15
4. "Dance Floor Anthem" – 4:04
5. "Keep Your Hands off My Girl" (B. Madden, J. Madden) – 3:25
6. "Victims of Love" – 3:45
7. "Where Would We Be Now" (Billy Martin, B. Madden, J. Madden) – 3:58
8. "Break Apart Her Heart" – 3:19
9. "All Black" – 4:19
10. "Beautiful Place" – 3:50
11. "Something Else" – 3:19
12. "Broken Hearts Parade" – 3:15
13. "March On" – 3:11

iTunes bonus track
No.	Title	Length
14.	"The River" (acoustic version)	3:34

Best Buy and US bonus track
No.	Title	Length
14.	"Jealousy" (or "You're Gone" on certain editions)	3:15

Target/Australian bonus DVD
No.	Title	Length
1.	"GCTV episode 1"
2.	"GCTV episode 2"
3.	"GCTV episode 3"
4.	"Good Morning Revival"
5.	"The River" (music video)
6.	"The Making of "The River""
7.	"Beautiful Place" (acoustic video)

Japanese bonus tracks
No.	Title	Length
1.	"Keep Your Hands Off My Girl" (Broken Spindles remix)	3:16
2.	"Face the Strange"	2:58

Japanese bonus DVD
No.	Title	Length
1.	"Keep Your Hands Off My Girl" (street version)
2.	"Keep Your Hands Off My Girl" (commercial version)
3.	"The River" (music video)
4.	"EPK"
5.	"I Just Wanna Live" (acoustic video)

== Personnel ==
Personnel per booklet.

Good Charlotte

- Joel Madden – vocals
- Benji Madden – guitars, vocals
- Billy Martin – guitars, keyboards
- Paul Thomas – bass
- Dean Butterworth – drums

Additional musicians

- BC Smith – programming
- Bart Hendrickson – programming
- The Incognito Horns – horns (track 12)
- Bobbie Page – background vocals (track 9)
- Terry Wood – background vocals (track 9)
- Maxine Waters – background vocals (track 9)
- Carmen Carter – background vocals (track 9)
- M. Shadows – lead vocals (track 3)
- Synyster Gates – lead guitar (track 3)

Production

- Don Gilmore – producer
- Mark Kiczula – recording
- Fox Phelps – assistant engineer
- Andy Wallace – mixing
- John O'Mahony – Pro Tools engineer
- Mike Scielzi – assistant
- Ted Jensen – mastering
- Marvin Scott Jarrett – art direction, photography
- Sheri Lee – art direction
- Fusako Chubachi – art direction
- Kristine Burns – photography
- Michael Dahan – photography

== Charts and certifications ==
=== Weekly charts ===
Chart (2007)	Peak position
Australian Albums (ARIA)	5
Austrian Albums (Ö3 Austria)	10
Canadian Albums (Billboard)	2
Dutch Albums (Album Top 100)	58
Finnish Albums (Suomen virallinen lista)	16
French Albums (SNEP)	38
German Albums (Offizielle Top 100)	10
Hungarian Albums (MAHASZ)	33
Italian Albums (FIMI)	32
New Zealand Albums (RMNZ)	2
Scottish Albums (OCC)	15
Swedish Albums (Sverigetopplistan)	23
Swiss Albums (Schweizer Hitparade)	7
UK Albums (OCC)	13
US Billboard 200	7

=== Year-end charts ===
Chart (2007)	Position
Australian Albums (ARIA)	23

=== Certifications ===
Region	Certification	Certified units/sales
Australia (ARIA)	Platinum	70,000^{^}
Canada (Music Canada)	Gold	50,000^{^}
New Zealand (RMNZ)	Gold	7,500^{^}
United Kingdom (BPI)	Silver	60,000^{*}
United States (RIAA)	Gold	500,000^{‡}
^{*} Sales figures based on certification alone.^{^} Shipments figures based on certification alone.^{‡} Sales+streaming figures based on certification alone.
