= Waking the Fallen =

Studio album by Avenged Sevenfold
- Released: August 26, 2003
- Recorded: April – June 10, 2003
- Studios: Third Stone (Hollywood); Mates Inc (Hollywood)
- Genres: Melodic metalcore; heavy metal
- Length: 68:45
- Label: Hopeless
- Producer: Mudrock

Avenged Sevenfold chronology
Sounding the Seventh Trumpet (2001)	Waking the Fallen (2003)	City of Evil (2005)

Singles from Waking the Fallen
- 1. "Eternal Rest/Chapter Four (promotional)" Released: June 19, 2003; 2. "Unholy Confessions" Released: August 2, 2004

Waking the Fallen: Resurrected

Waking the Fallen is the second studio album by American heavy metal band Avenged Sevenfold, released on August 26, 2003, through Hopeless Records. It is the band's first full-length album with new lead guitarist Synyster Gates and bassist Johnny Christ.

The album was certified gold on July 15, 2009, even though it sold only 3,000 copies in its first week of release. As of August 2014, the album has sold over 693,000 copies in the United States. As of March 17, 2021, the album has been certified Platinum in the United States and Gold in both Canada and the United Kingdom. The song "Eternal Rest" appears on Kerrang!'s "666 Songs You Must Own" and was featured on the soundtrack to the movie Saw IV (2007).

== Background and recording ==
On January 18, 2002, Avenged Sevenfold left Good Life Recordings and signed with Hopeless Records. They re-released their debut album on March 19 and also appeared on the Hopelessly Devoted to You Vol. 4 sampler in April. The band started to receive recognition, performing with bands such as Mushroomhead and Shadows Fall. They spent the year touring in support of their debut album and participated in the Vans Warped Tour.

In September of 2002, Dameon Ash left Avenged Sevenfold and was replaced by Johnny Christ. Christ has previously played with the band whenever Ash could not attend, filling in on a previous tour. Having found a new bassist, the group began recording their new album. Waking the Fallen was released on Hopeless Records in August 2003.

Waking the Fallen was the band's first album in which they recorded to a click track, which Sanders recalled upset Sullivan. Haner said the band played Halo: Combat Evolved frequently during the album's recording process.

== Composition and music ==
According to Eli Enis of Revolver, Avenged Sevenfold "became a capital-‘M’ metal band" with Waking the Fallen. The album has been primarily categorized musically as metalcore, melodic metalcore and traditional heavy metal, while also taking stylistic cues from melodic death metal, thrash metal and power metal. The tracks have been described as "anthemic," and are said to feature a "gothic undercurrent." Additionally, the album featured a more refined and mature sound production in comparison to their previous album. This is the first release by the band to feature lead guitarist Synyster Gates on all tracks, which resulted in more complex instrumentation, featuring more guitar harmonies and guitar solos. "Chapter Four" contains what has been described as "old-school riffage." "Eternal Rest" has drawn comparisons to Pantera and Randy Rhoads. Robert L. Doerschuk of AllMusic wrote, "whether attacking a riff in unison or in harmonized parts, the double-threat guitars of Synyster Gates and Zacky Vengeance do their duty like search-and-destroy commandos -- in and out fast, leaving devastation in their wake. According to Johnny Loftus of AllMusic, the album contains "as many sighing harmonies as it did harmonized guitar freakouts." Additionally, the album contains what have been described as "sharp, inventive song structures [and] and huge choruses." The chorus of the track "Remenissions" incorporates flamenco guitar. M. Shadows' screaming on the album has drawn comparisons to Cradle of Filth frontman Dani Filth, and has been described as "theatrical."

== Reception and legacy ==
Professional ratings
Review scores
Source	Rating
AllMusic	3.5/5 stars
Blender	4/5 stars
Drowned in Sound	7/10
Louder Sound	(reissue)
Sputnikmusic	3.0/5.0
Ultimate Guitar	9.6/10 stars

Waking the Fallen was met with highly positive reviews. Robert L. Doerschuk of AllMusic gave the album a positive review, saying: " Especially noteworthy -- and note-heavy -- is the guitar solo that blazes through the last moments of "Second Heartbeat" and the head-spinning single-stroke virtuosity of the Reverend throughout the album."

It received a positive profile in Billboard, with the magazine comparing Avenged Sevenfold to bands like NOFX, Iron Maiden, and Metallica. In other profiles, the album also received comparisons to the Misfits and further comparisons to Iron Maiden. "Chapter Four" was featured in video games such as NASCAR Thunder 2004, Madden NFL 04, and NHL 04, which helped the band get recognized and sign a contract with Warner Bros. Records. Overall reviews on Ultimate Guitar were very positive and along with 2016's The Stage has the highest overall rating of any Avenged Sevenfold studio albums on Ultimate Guitar.

Metal Hammer magazine placed Waking the Fallen on No. 6 spot of their 100 Greatest Albums of the 21st Century list in 2016. In 2020, John Hill of Loudwire included the album in his list of the "Top 25 Metalcore Albums of All Time."

Fans regard the guitar solo on "Second Heartbeat" as being among the best in the metalcore genre, according to Loudwire.

=== Anniversary edition ===
In March 2014, vocalist M. Shadows revealed in an interview with Loudwire that the band had plans in the works to put something out for the overdue 10th anniversary of Waking the Fallen:

We're going to put something together for the 10 year anniversary of 'Waking the Fallen,' which is about 11 or 12 years now. We've been trying to think of something we could put together and we found some old demos that we did with Teppei [Teranishi] from Thrice before we even did that record.... We also found some old footage with [late drummer] Jimmy [Sullivan] playing some old shows at The Henry Fonda Theater in L.A., and the Ventura Theater. We'll put together a cool DVD and some demo tracks and re-release 'Waking the Fallen' for newer fans of the band that haven't gotten that or don't know about the history of the band.

— M. Shadows, Loudwire interview, March 2014

Waking the Fallen: Resurrected was released August 25, 2014.

== Videography ==
A live performance video was shot at Warped Tour 2003 for "Second Heartbeat". A video was made for the single "Unholy Confessions" on March 6, 2004, using live footage set to the studio track. It featured the fans before and during an Avenged Sevenfold show at the Henry Fonda Theater. According to vocalist M. Shadows, it was requested by their new label, Warner Bros. Records, in order to publicize the band before their 2005 album City of Evil.

This video was the second attempt at a video for the track. The previous attempt was a concept video, filmed three months before. The band was not happy with the final product, however, and opted to re-shoot the video, this time as a live performance. The new video went into rotation on MTV2's Headbangers Ball.

In 2014, a music video for "Chapter Four" was released to promote the release of "Waking The Fallen: Resurrected". The video features clips of the band playing live, shot entirely in black and white. The footage is from the same show was also used for the Unholy Confessions video a decade prior. The video was directed by Rafa Alcantara.

== Track listing ==
All tracks are written by Avenged Sevenfold (Zachary Baker, Brian Haner Jr., Matthew Sanders, Jonathan Seward, James Sullivan), unless otherwise noted.

Waking the Fallen track list
No.	Title	Writer(s)	Length
1.	"Waking the Fallen"	Baker, Scott Gilman, Haner Jr., Sanders, Seward, Sullivan	1:43
2.	"Unholy Confessions"	Baker, Haner, Sanders	4:44
3.	"Chapter Four"		5:43
4.	"Remenissions"		6:07
5.	"Desecrate Through Reverence"		5:39
6.	"Eternal Rest"		5:13
7.	"Second Heartbeat"		7:01
8.	"Radiant Eclipse"		6:10
9.	"I Won't See You Tonight Part 1"		8:59
10.	"I Won't See You Tonight Part 2"		4:45
11.	"Clairvoyant Disease"		5:00
12.	"And All Things Will End"		7:41
Total length:			68:45

iTunes deluxe version bonus tracks
No.	Title	Length
13.	"Eternal Rest (Live from Ventura Theater - January 2004)"	5:28
14.	"Second Heartbeat (Demo Version)"	6:20
15.	"Unholy Confessions" (music video)	4:54
16.	"We Come Out at Night" (live video at Warped Tour)	4:46
Total length:		90:13

Waking the Fallen: Resurrected
No.	Title	Length
1.	"Waking the Fallen: Resurrected"	2:51
2.	"Second Heartbeat (Alternate Version)"	6:20
3.	"Chapter Four (Demo Version)"	6:24
4.	"Remenissions (Demo Version)"	6:12
5.	"I Won't See You Tonight (Part 1) (Demo Version)"	6:07
6.	"I Won't See You Tonight (Part 2) (Demo Version)"	5:28
7.	"Intro/Chapter Four (Live in Ventura)"	7:10
8.	"Desecrate Through Reverence (Live In Pomona)"	5:44
9.	"Eternal Rest (Live in Pomona)"	5:17
10.	"Unholy Confessions (Live in Ventura)"	5:16
11.	"Second Heartbeat (Live in Ventura)"	7:08
12.	"I Won't See You Tonight (Part 1) (Live in Ventura)" (exclusive bonus track)	8:38
13.	"I Won't See You Tonight (Part 2) (Live in Ventura)" (exclusive bonus track)	4:58
Total length:		77:24

- "Desecrate Through Reverence" is mistakenly written as "Desecrate Through Reverance" in the Resurrected booklet.
- The demo version and alternate version of "Second Heartbeat" are the same; this version was previously released on the Hopelessly Devoted To You Vol. 4 sampler in 2002.
- The live version of "Eternal Rest" on the iTunes deluxe version is the same as the one on Resurrected; it was previously released on the Hopelessly Devoted To You Vol. 5 sampler in 2004. On Resurrected, it's mistakenly said to be from Pomona.

== Personnel ==
Credits are adapted from the album's liner notes.

Avenged Sevenfold

- M. Shadows – vocals
- Zacky Vengeance – rhythm guitar
- Synyster Gates – lead guitar, piano
- Johnny Christ – bass
- The Rev – drums

Production

- Andrew Murdock – producer, mixing engineer
- Fred Archambault – co-producer
- THE GATEKEEPERS – recording
- Ai Fujisaki – assistant engineer
- Tom Baker – mastering engineer
- Mike Fasano, Bruce Jacoby, Al Pahanish – drum tech
- Stephen Ferrara – guitar tech
- Scott Gilman – orchestral arrangements and performance

Artistry

- Lisa Johnson – photography
- Taylor Montague – cover painting
- Micah Montague – art concept
- Matt the Madman – layout
- Sergie – mechanicals

== Charts ==
Chart (2003)	Peak position
US Independent Albums	12
US Top Heatseekers Albums	15
Chart (2006)	Peak position
Japanese Albums (Oricon)	176
Chart (2014)	Peak position
Australian Albums (ARIA)	34
Austrian Albums (Ö3 Austria)	35
German Albums (Offizielle Top 100)	48
Japanese Albums (Oricon)	237
Spanish Albums (Promusicae)	62
US Billboard 200	10
US Catalog Albums (Billboard)	1
US Vinyl Albums (Billboard)	5

== Certifications ==
Certifications for Waking The Fallen
Region	Certification	Certified units/sales
Canada (Music Canada)	Gold	50,000^{^}
United Kingdom (BPI)	Gold	100,000^{‡}
United States (RIAA)	Platinum	1,000,000^{‡}
^{^} Shipments figures based on certification alone.^{‡} Sales+streaming figures based on certification alone.
