= The Confession (band) =

American heavy metal band

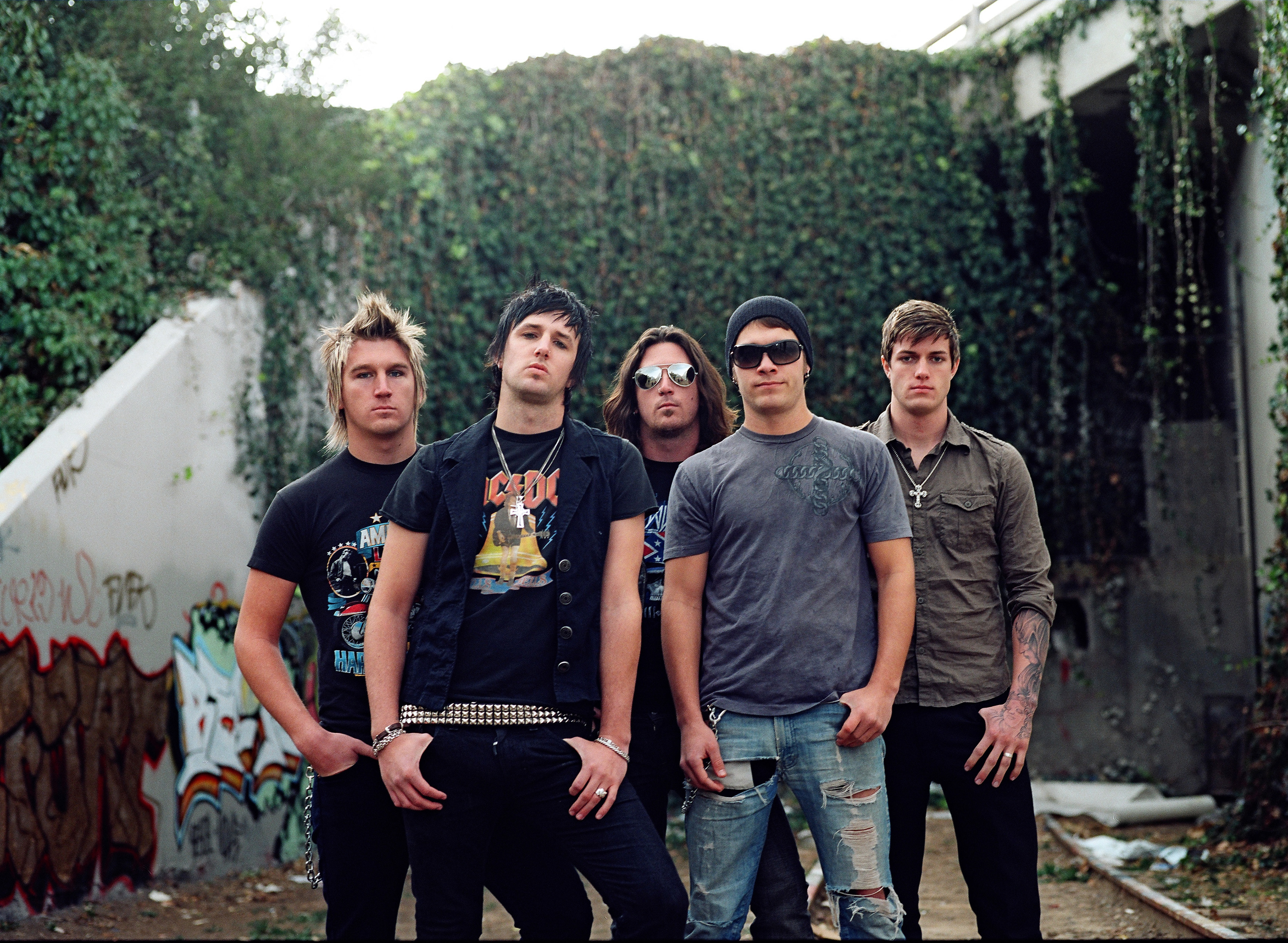
- The Confession in 2007

Background information
- Origin: Orange County, California, U.S.
- Genres: Hard rock; heavy metal; metalcore
- Years active: 2005–2008
- Labels: Record Collection; Science; Warner Bros.
- Past members: Taylor Holland Armstrong; Kevin Fyfe; Justin Norman; Snake Ortiz; Matt Pauling; Jeff Veta

The Confession was an American heavy metal band from Dana Point, California. Shortly after their formation in 2005, they went on to tour with such bands as Avenged Sevenfold, Bullet for My Valentine and Megadeth and were slotted on Rockstar's 2006 Taste of Chaos tour. The band announced their breakup in January 2008 after touring with Avenged Sevenfold. In the three years that The Confession were together, they released a self-titled five-song EP and their only full-length album, Requiem (produced by M. Shadows of Avenged Sevenfold).

The track "Through These Eyes" was featured on EA's racing game Burnout Dominator. The EP version of "Jealousy" appears in ATV Offroad Fury 4.

== Band members ==
Final lineup

- Taylor Holland Armstrong — vocals (2005–2008)
- Kevin Fyfe — guitar (2005–2008)
- Justin Norman — guitar (2006–2008)
- Matt Pauling — guitar (2005–2006), bass (2006–2008)
- Jeff Veta — drums (2005–2008)

Former members

- Jake "Snake" Ortiz — bass (2005–2006)

== Discography ==
- The Confession — October 11, 2005 (Record Collection)
- Requiem — March 20, 2007 (Science Records)
