= Chapter Four (song) =

Single by Avenged Sevenfold

from the album Waking the Fallen
- A-side: "Eternal Rest" (double A-side)
- Released: June 19, 2003
- Recorded: April – June 2003
- Studio: Third Stone, Hollywood, California; Mates Inc, Hollywood, California
- Genre: Metalcore
- Length: 5:43
- Label: Hopeless
- Songwriter: Avenged Sevenfold
- Producers: Mudrock; Fred Archambault

Avenged Sevenfold singles chronology
"Warmness on the Soul" (2001)	"Eternal Rest" / "Chapter Four" (2003)	"Unholy Confessions" (2004)

"Chapter Four" is a song by American heavy metal band Avenged Sevenfold. The song was released as a double A-side single with "Eternal Rest" from their second album, Waking the Fallen, where it also appears as track three.

== Background ==
The lyrics of "Chapter Four" are about the story of Cain and Abel. An early demo of the song was featured on the reissue of Waking the Fallen.

== Music video ==
In 2014, the band released a music video for "Chapter Four" to promote the release of "Waking The Fallen: Resurrected". The video features clips of the band playing live, shot entirely in black and white. Footage from the same show was also used to film a music video for Unholy Confessions a decade prior. The video was directed by Rafa Alcantara.

== Critical reception ==
"Chapter Four" is regarded as one of the best songs from the band's early days. In 2020, Louder Sound and Kerrang ranked the song at number thirteen and number fifteen, respectively, on their lists of the 20 greatest Avenged Sevenfold songs.

== In media ==
"Chapter Four" appeared in the 2003 EA Sports games Madden NFL 2004, NASCAR Thunder 2004, and NHL 2004. The band had submitted Waking the Fallen to Electronic Arts for their soundtracks, which EA music executive Steve Schnur approved as he wanted to include artists whose songs were popular at sporting events. The EA titles were Avenged Sevenfold's first time providing video game music.

== Track listings ==
CD promo single

No.	Title	Length
1.	"Eternal Rest"	5:13
2.	"Chapter Four"	5:44

Digital promo

No.	Title	Length
1.	"Eternal Rest"	5:13
2.	"Chapter Four"	5:43

== Personnel ==
Credits are adapted from the album's liner notes.

Avenged Sevenfold

- M. Shadows – lead vocals
- Zacky Vengeance – rhythm guitar
- The Rev – drums
- Synyster Gates – lead guitar
- Johnny Christ – bass guitar

Production

- Andrew Murdock – producer, mixing engineer
- Fred Archambault – co-producer
- THE GATEKEEPERS - recording
- Ai Fujisaki – assistant engineer
- Tom Baker – mastering engineer
- Mike Fasano, Bruce Jacoby, Al Pahanish – drum tech
- Stephen Ferrara – guitar tech
- Larry Jacobson Company – management
- Ryan Harlacher – booking
- Scott Bradford – legal representation
