= Tony Petrossian =

Iranian commercial and music video director

- Occupations: Commercial director; music video director

Tony Petrossian is an American commercial and music video director of Armenian descent, based in Los Angeles, California. He is best known for his work with rock and metal acts on the Roadrunner Records label, most prominently Slipknot, as well as directing television commercials for brands, including Nike, McDonald's, Subway, and Barbie. His music videos have won two Grammy Awards for Best Metal Performance for Slipknot's "Before I Forget" and Slayer's "Eyes of the Insane" and his music video work also earned him nominations at the MTV Video Music Awards and the Much Music Video Awards, while his commercial output earned recognition from the CLIO advertising organisation and coverage from outlets including The New York Times and Forbes, along with an "Ad of the Day" citation from Adweek and a #1 placement on SHOOT magazine's annual "Best of the Best" review. For feature films and television projects in the United States, Petrossian is represented by William Morris Endeavor.

== Career ==
=== Early career and music videos ===
Petrossian began directing music videos in 2002, with Vem Miller, as part of the directing team "Vem & Tony," on a run of hip-hop, rock, and rap-metal videos, including "Shhh…(Hope Diggy)" for The Apex Theory, "Daddy Get That Cash" for Styles P, and "Remember Me" for Hoobastank. Through 2003 the pair directed a further run of videos together, among them songs for Powerman 5000, Alien Ant Farm, Cam'ron, DMX, and Pharrell Williams. A full list of these early credits appears in the filmography below.

Later he become associated with Rockhard Films, a Los Angeles-based production company run by director Marc Klasfeld. He quickly established a reputation for visually arresting, high-energy work with rock and metal acts.

His breakthrough came in 2004 when he co-directed the music video for Slipknot's single "Duality" alongside percussionist Shawn Crahan. Filmed on 27 March 2004 at a fan's house in West Des Moines, Iowa, the video featured the band performing in close quarters as hundreds of fans progressively destroyed the interior of the property. The production cost between $300,000 and $500,000. In 2010, Roadrunner Records ranked "Duality" the greatest music video in the label's history, with label video authority Elias Chios writing that it captured the raw energy and chaos of the band's performance. The same Roadrunner countdown placed a second Petrossian-directed video at number four of all time "Through Glass" by Stone Sour giving him the top and fourth positions simultaneously.

In 2004, Petrossian directed the videos for Slipknot's "Vermilion" and the Gene Simmons single "Firestarter," as well as directing "The End of Heartache" for Killswitch Engage.

In 2005, Petrossian directed the video for "Before I Forget", the third single from Slipknot's album Vol. 3: (The Subliminal Verses). The video was notable for being the first time the band had performed on camera without their masks; Petrossian used tight framing and strategic camera angles to obscure the members' faces, while their masks were displayed beside them during the performance. In an interview with Music Video Wire, Petrossian recalled that the concept had first been discussed with Crahan during the "Duality" shoot the previous year, when Crahan had expressed a desire for the band to unmask on camera. "Before I Forget" went on to win the Grammy Award for Best Metal Performance at the 48th Annual Grammy Awards in 2006, Slipknot's first Grammy win after six consecutive nominations in that category. The video was also voted "Most Rocking Video" by the Scuzz audience in the channel's Top 100 Most Rocking Videos countdown of 2007.

=== 2006–2009: Continued music video work ===
The period from 2006 to 2009 represented Petrossian's most prolific phase in music video direction, during which he collaborated with a wide range of rock, metal, and hip-hop artists.

For Slayer, Petrossian directed the video for "Eyes of the Insane", filmed in the Los Angeles area in August 2006. The video presents the scene as a close-up of a soldier's pupil and iris, which reflect images of war, flashbacks of his family, and ultimately his death. Guitarist Jeff Hanneman told the metal publication Metal-Rules.com that the band was enthusiastic about the concept and that he personally found the video striking. The song subsequently won the Grammy Award for Best Metal Performance at the 49th Grammy Awards.

Petrossian also directed the video for Avenged Sevenfold's "Beast and the Harlot" (2006), taken from the band's album City of Evil. His director's commentary on the video was included on the band's 2007 DVD release All Excess.

A music video for Stone Sour's "Through Glass" was shot by Petrossian and posted online at Yahoo! Music Canada on 9 July 2006.

== Recognition and awards ==
Award	Category / Notes	Year	Result
Grammy Award for Best Metal Performance	Slipknot – "Before I Forget" (directed by Petrossian)	2006	Won
Grammy Award for Best Metal Performance	Slayer – "Eyes of the Insane" (directed by Petrossian)	2007	Won
MTV Video Music Awards	Best Director	—	Nominated
MTV Video Music Awards	Best Editor	—	Nominated
Much Music Video Awards	Video of the Year	—	Nominated
MVPA Awards	Rock Video of the Year (US)	—	Nominated
MVPA Awards	European Rock Video of the Year	—	Won
South by Southwest	Audience Award	—	Won
Clio Awards	Recognised as "groundbreaking"	—	—
Addy Awards	Gold Addy	—	Won
Addy Awards	Silver Addy	—	Won
Source Award	—	—	Won
SHOOT New Directors Showcase	Selected	2007	—
Roadrunner Records All-Time Top 10 Videos	#1 – "Duality" (Slipknot)	2010	—
Roadrunner Records All-Time Top 10 Videos	#4 – "Through Glass" (Stone Sour)	2010	—
Scuzz Top 100 Most Rocking Videos	"Most Rocking Video" – "Before I Forget" (Slipknot)	2007	Won
Adweek	"Ad of the Day"	—	—
SHOOT "Best of the Best" annual review	#1 placement	—	—

== Filmography ==
=== Music videos (selected) ===
Year	Song	Artist	Notes
2002	"Shhh…(Hope Diggy)"	The Apex Theory	
2002	"Daddy Get That Cash"	Styles P	With Vem Miller
2002	"Remember Me"	Hoobastank	With Vem Miller
2003	"Action"	Powerman 5000	With Vem Miller
2003	"Glow"	Alien Ant Farm	With Vem Miller
2003	"Are We Cuttin'"	Pastor Troy feat. Timbaland	With Vem Miller
2003	"Rock N Roll"	Fam-Lay feat. Pharrell Williams and the Clipse	With Vem Miller
2003	"Bout It Bout It"	Cam'ron feat. Dipset	With Vem Miller
2003	"Blackout"	(hed) p.e.	With Vem Miller
2003	"I Keep It Gangsta"	B.G.	With Vem Miller
2003	"Freetime"	Kenna	With Vem Miller
2003	"Luv Me Baby"	Murphy Lee feat. Nelly & Jazze Pha	With Vem Miller
2003	"Smothered"	Spineshank	With Vem Miller
2003	"Who Gives a F**k Where You're From?"	DJ Kay Slay and Three 6 Mafia	With Vem Miller
2003	"It's All Real"	Pitch Black	With Vem Miller
2003	"Where Da Hood At"	DMX	With Vem Miller
2004	"Duality"	Slipknot	Co-directed with Shawn Crahan; #1 in Roadrunner Records all-time top 10
2004	"Vermilion"	Slipknot	
2004	"The End of Heartache"	Killswitch Engage	
2004	"Firestarter"	Gene Simmons	
2004	"S.A.N.T.A.N.A."	The Diplomats	
2005	"Before I Forget"	Slipknot	Grammy Award for Best Metal Performance (2006); voted "Most Rocking Video" by Scuzz (2007)
2005	"I'm On A High"	Millionaire	
2006	"No Tomorrow"	Orson	
2006	"Beast and the Harlot"	Avenged Sevenfold	
2006	"Bright Idea"	Orson	
2006	"Graduation Day"	Head Automatica	
2006	"Tears Don't Fall"	Bullet for My Valentine	Co-directed
2006	"Through Glass"	Stone Sour	#4 in Roadrunner Records all-time top 10
2006	"Pain"	Three Days Grace	
2006	"Liar (It Takes One to Know One)"	Taking Back Sunday	
2006	"Eyes of the Insane"	Slayer	Grammy Award for Best Metal Performance (2007)
2006	"Prayer of the Refugee"	Rise Against	
2007	"Never Too Late"	Three Days Grace	
2007	"I'm Not Jesus"	Apocalyptica feat. Corey Taylor	
2007	"Empty Walls"	Serj Tankian	
2007	"Fake It"	Seether	
2007	"Scream, Aim, Fire"	Bullet for My Valentine	
2008	"Sky Is Over"	Serj Tankian	
2008	"Rise Above This"	Seether	
2008	"Breakdown"	Seether	
2008	"How We Do It In The A"	Lloyd feat. Ludacris	
2008	"What You Look For"	Sam Beeton	
2008	"You Better Pray"	The Red Jumpsuit Apparatus	
2009	"Not Meant to Be"	Theory of a Deadman	
2009	"If This Is It"	Newton Faulkner	
2009	"Careless Whisper"	Seether	
2012	"The Crazy Ones"	Stellar Revival	

=== Commercials (selected) ===
Client	Campaign	Location
Futuroscope	"Robotic Seats"	Paris, France
Nike	"Beijing Ballers"	Beijing, China
Zoo York	"Tough"	New York, NY
Zoo York	"Spread the Word"	New York, NY
Environmental Defense Fund	"Grounded"	Los Angeles, CA
Subway	"Fence"	Charlotte, NC
Dannon	"Into Thin Air" (flamingo campaign)	New York, NY
Beeline Telecom	"Sea of Communication"	Kiev, Ukraine
Beeline Telecom	"Hockey"	Moscow, Russia
Beeline Telecom	"Tattoo" (Cambodia launch)	Bangkok, Thailand
Sony Ericsson	AINO global launch	Barcelona, Spain
Sony Ericsson	SATIO global launch	Barcelona, Spain
Sony Ericsson	"Space Hopper Invasion" (viral film)	Barcelona, Spain
Manchester United F.C. / Beeline Telecom	Feat. Wayne Rooney & Javier Hernández	Manchester, England
Manchester United F.C. / Beeline Telecom	Feat. Wayne Rooney & Park Ji-sung	Manchester, England
Nike	"Change Sport"	Taipei, Taiwan & Singapore
Alexander Keith's Beer	"Moving Walls"	Prague, Czech Republic
Alexander Keith's Beer	"Conveyor Belt"	Prague, Czech Republic
Beeline Telecom	"Magnetism"	Bangkok, Thailand
McDonald's	"Real Fruit Smoothies / Paint Ball War"	Los Angeles, CA
McDonald's	"Photos"	Los Angeles, CA
McDonald's	"Piñatas" / "Real Fruit Smoothies"	Los Angeles, CA
Minute Maid	"Lion Dance"	Shanghai, China
Coca-Cola (Burn Energy Drink)	"The Cap"	Los Angeles, CA & Moscow, Russia
Tennessee Dept. of Transportation	Anti-drunk-driving campaign, "Backseat"	Nashville, TN
Cape Cod Chips	"Seagulls"	Los Angeles, CA
Key Bank	"Beach Balls"	Los Angeles, CA
Singtel	"Surprise Pop Performance"	Singapore
Lance Crackers	"Keepin' It Real"	Los Angeles, CA
Demix Sportswear	"Fitness Girls"	Los Angeles, CA
Nokia	"Ashes"	Kiev, Ukraine
Merrell Shoes	"Car v. Bike"	Los Angeles, CA
Sportmaster	"Snowman"	Los Angeles, CA
Merrell Shoes	"Weather Dogs"	Los Angeles, CA
Indiana Lottery	"Fellow Bingolians!"	Indianapolis, IN
Indiana Lottery	"Hoosier Lottery"	Indianapolis, IN
Moschino Barbie	—	Los Angeles, CA
Merrell Shoes	"Snow Dogs"	Los Angeles, CA
Barbie	"Spy Squad"	Los Angeles, CA
McDonald's	"Create Your Taste"	Los Angeles, CA
Barbie	"Mix & Color"	Los Angeles, CA
Vonage	"Family Phone"	Portland, OR
Maryland Lottery	"Baseball Bucks"	Baltimore, MD
Gazprom ("G-Drive")	Feat. Ilya Kovalchuk	St. Petersburg, Russia
