= Amy Sanders =

American basketball player (born 1983)

Personal information
- Born: June 5, 1983 (age 43) Huntington Beach, California
- Listed height: 5 ft 11 in (1.80 m)
- Listed weight: 156 lb (71 kg)

Career information
- High school: Mater Dei (Santa Ana, California)
- College: Hawaii (2002–2006)
- WNBA draft: 2006: undrafted
- Position: Guard
- Number: 13

Career history
- 2006: Umeå Comets
- 2007: Detroit Shock
- 2008: AZS Poznań
- 2010: Leipzig Eagles
- Stats at Basketball Reference

Amy Marie Sanders (born June 5, 1983) is an American college and professional basketball player. After playing for the Hawaii Rainbow Wahine, she moved to the Umeå Comets in the Swedish Damligan before signing with the Detroit Shock of the WNBA for the 2007 season. The next year she signed a training camp contract with the Sacramento Monarchs, but she subsequently returned to FIBA Europe basketball, playing for AZS Poznań in the Polish PLKK and Leipzig Eagles in the German Bundesliga.

== College career ==
Sanders played youth basketball for the Orange County Spirit club. She had also been decorated for her performances for Mater Dei High School. In 2002, she joined University of Hawaii in preference to several other interested Universities. In her four-year varsity career, Sanders was twice the Hawaii Rainbow Wahine's top-pointscorer. In April 2005 she was voted the top player at the team's annual banquet. When Sanders played her last game for the Rainbow Wahine in February 2006, coach Jim Bolla described her as: "one of the hardest working players I've had in my years of coaching."

== Career statistics ==
Legend
GP	Games played	GS	Games started	MPG	Minutes per game	RPG	Rebounds per game
APG	Assists per game	SPG	Steals per game	BPG	Blocks per game	PPG	Points per game
TO	Turnovers per game	FG%	Field-goal percentage	3P%	3-point field-goal percentage	FT%	Free-throw percentage
**Bold**	Career best	°	League leader

=== WNBA ===
==== Regular season ====
Year	Team	GP	GS	MPG	FG%	3P%	FT%	RPG	APG	SPG	BPG	TO	PPG
2007	Detroit	6	0	1.5	0.0	0.0	50.0	0.3	0.0	0.0	0.0	0.3	0.3
Career	1 year, 1 team	6	0	1.5	0.0	0.0	50.0	0.3	0.0	0.0	0.0	0.3	0.3

=== College ===
Legend
GP	Games played	GS	Games started	MPG	Minutes per game
FG%	Field goal percentage	3P%	3-point field goal percentage	FT%	Free throw percentage
RPG	Rebounds per game	APG	Assists per game	SPG	Steals per game
BPG	Blocks per game	PPG	Points per game	**Bold**	Career high

Year	Team	GP	Points	FG%	3P%	FT%	RPG	APG	SPG	BPG	PPG
2002–03	Hawai'i	30	83	25.7	13.6	60.0	2.2	1.0	0.3	–	2.8
2003–04	Hawai'i	28	143	35.2	36.8	**82.9**	3.8	1.3	0.4	0.1	5.1
2004–05	Hawai'i	26	313	**35.7**	**37.2**	73.1	**6.3**	2.1	1.2	**0.2**	12.0
2005–06	Hawai'i	27	**351**	32.9	27.9	74.8	5.5	**2.8**	1.2	0.1	**13.0**
Career	Hawai'i	111	890	33.3	31.2	73.3	4.4	1.8	0.8	0.1	8.0

== Club career ==
After the expiration of her college eligibility, Sanders was overlooked at the 2006 WNBA draft. She signed for Sweden's Umeå Comets in September 2006 on a full–time professional contract. It was reported that she proved a successful acquisition for the team, but she left during the Christmas break in December to complete her studies in the United States.

Sanders was called into the training camp of reigning WNBA champions Detroit Shock in April 2007. In the 2007 WNBA season she featured in six games for the Shock—averaging one and a half minutes in each—before being waived from the team on July 2, 2007.

In January 2008 Sanders agreed a deal with Polish outfit AZS Poznań and she arrived the following month, to considerable local media attention. After playing seven PLKK matches, for an average of nine points, she departed AZS Poznań by mutual consent in March 2008. Sanders returned to the WNBA after being called into the Sacramento Monarchs' pre–season training camp as a free agent, but she was waived 11 days later without playing in a competitive game.

Having left basketball in summer 2008, Sanders was later tempted out of retirement to help financially troubled German Bundesliga club Leipzig Eagles. She made her debut in January 2010 against SV Halle and played for free during her time in Germany. When the team were relegated in March and the American coach Ritz Ingram left, Sanders and other senior players also made an exit.

== Personal life ==
Sanders was born in Huntington Beach, California to Kim and Gary Sanders. She has one elder brother, Matthew, who is the lead vocalist of heavy metal band Avenged Sevenfold under the stage name M. Shadows.
