= The River (Good Charlotte song) =

Single by Good Charlotte featuring M. Shadows and Synyster Gates

from the album Good Morning Revival
- Released: January 4, 2007
- Recorded: 2006
- Genre: pop-punk
- Length: 3:16
- Label: Epic; Daylight
- Songwriters: Joel Madden; Benji Madden
- Producer: Don Gilmore

Good Charlotte singles chronology
"We Believe" (2005)	"The River" (2007)	"Keep Your Hands off My Girl" (2007)

"The River" is a song by Good Charlotte featuring M. Shadows and Synyster Gates of the band Avenged Sevenfold. The song was the first single from the Good Morning Revival album in North America and the second single throughout the rest of the world except for Australia. On December 8, 2006, the second GCTV episode was released on Good Charlotte's website. "The River" was featured in the video and can be heard playing in the background. The song was premiered January 4, 2007, on their official website, and via the band's Myspace. The song impacted radio on January 23, 2007. There are several references to the Bible throughout the song and the overall time of the song is three minutes and sixteen seconds, intentionally to reference John 3:16.

Shortly after Jimmy "the Rev" Sullivan's death, Good Charlotte dedicated the song to him.

== Music video ==
Music video of "The River"

A music video for the song was shot in mid-December 2006, in Los Angeles, California with director Marc Webb, who has done "The Motivation Proclamation" and "Festival Song" videos for the band before, but had not directed a video for them since 2001. It features Good Charlotte performing alongside the concrete L.A. river bank that runs through the city, contrasted with classic images of the beauty and history of Los Angeles. The video clip shows the two sides of L.A., the excitement and glamour of L.A. that the band witnessed early on in their career and then the deeper/darker hidden side of L.A. that people and the band saw after living there for years. Myspace celebrity Jeffree Star and actress Megan Fox are featured in the background throughout the video.

Synyster Gates and L.A. in the background

There are two different videos for the song, one including M. Shadows and Synyster Gates, the other video is the version of the song without the members of Avenged Sevenfold featuring in it. GCTV episode three shows the video shoot of "The River". The video featuring M. Shadows and Synyster Gates premiered on MTV on February 7, 2007. The original version of the video, that does not feature Avenged Sevenfold's guitarist Synyster Gates and vocalist M. Shadows, was briefly shown on TRL.

The music video for "The River" was added to United Kingdom music channels Kerrang! and Scuzz on April 13, 2007, indicating that it was the second single in the UK from Good Charlotte and it was released on May 21, 2007. The video with Gates and Shadows features them morphing into one another, Benji into Joel, Shadows into Benji and so on. Synyster Gates is seen playing his Schecter Signature guitar.

== Chart performance ==
"The River" debuted on the Billboard Hot 100 at number 93 in early February 2007 due to digital downloads, but fell off the chart the following week. However, it went back onto the charts a few weeks later, landing at number 89. It is the first Good Charlotte single to land a spot on the Billboard Pop 100. The song ultimately peaked at number 39 on the Hot 100, becoming their second top 40 hit on that chart.

== Track listing ==
"The River"
A 30-second sample of "The River", the first single from Good Morning Revival. The song features members from Avenged Sevenfold, M. Shadows and Synyster Gates.

1. "The River" (featuring M. Shadows and Synyster Gates)
2. "The River" (acoustic version)
3. "You're Gone"
4. "The River" (video)

== Personnel ==
Good Charlotte

- Joel Madden – vocals
- Benji Madden – guitar, backing vocals
- Billy Martin – guitar, keyboards
- Paul Thomas – bass
- Dean Butterworth – drums

Avenged Sevenfold

- M. Shadows – vocals
- Synyster Gates – guitar

Production

- Don Gilmore – producer
- Andy Wallace – mixing

== Charts ==
Chart (2007–08)	Peak position
Austria (Ö3 Austria Top 40)	37
Canada Hot 100 (Billboard)	48
Denmark (Tracklisten)	23
Germany (Official German Charts)	40
UK Singles (OCC)	108
UK Singles Downloads (OCC)	95
US Billboard Hot 100	39
US Alternative Airplay (Billboard)	38
US Pop 100 (Billboard)	39

== Certifications ==
Region	Certification	Certified units/sales
United Kingdom (BPI)	Silver	200,000^{‡}
United States (RIAA)	Gold	500,000^{‡}
^{‡} Sales+streaming figures based on certification alone.
