= Unholy Confessions =

Single by Avenged Sevenfold

from the album Waking the Fallen
- Released: August 2, 2004
- Recorded: April – June 2003
- Studio: Third Stone, Hollywood, California; Mates Inc, Hollywood, California
- Genre: Metalcore; heavy metal; melodic death metal
- Length: 4:43
- Label: Hopeless
- Songwriters: Zachary Baker; Matthew Sanders; Brian Haner Jr.
- Producers: Mudrock; Fred Archambault

Avenged Sevenfold singles chronology
"Eternal Rest/Chapter Four" (2003)	"Unholy Confessions" (2004)	"Burn It Down" (2005)

"Unholy Confessions" is a song by American heavy metal band Avenged Sevenfold, released as the lead single from their second album, Waking the Fallen, although "Eternal Rest" and "Chapter Four" were previously released as a promotional double A-side single. It is the band's first official single after their 2001 debut EP release Warmness on the Soul, and was the first single by the band to receive mainstream exposure, being heavily rotated on MTV2's Headbangers Ball.

The song appeared on the Metal=Life compilation in 2005.

The song has been called "one of its era’s most beloved tracks."

== Background and writing ==
"Unholy Confessions" was written by members Zacky Vengeance, M. Shadows and Synyster Gates. The main riff was written by Vengeance, and had been floating around for a while before the rest of the band completed the song, and the chorus and lyrics were written by Shadows.

The band has stated that the song's writing process was different than that of other tracks. Sanders recalled the song's writing process:

"Zack had a riff that he had been playing over and over and over in the garage. We would jam on it a little bit but we didn’t really know what to do with it. Then we left for tour – it was some sort of [suicide awareness initiative] Take Action Tour or something. We were staying at our booking agent’s house in Chicago and we said, ‘Let’s write a song.’ So we all wrote in separate rooms. We’ve never done that since! I came up with the chorus for 'Unholy Confessions' and we kind of put it on the backburner. When we got back home to Orange County, we had that riff and we had the chorus; we just needed some stupid, meaty breakdown! [laughs] And that part of the song came together. We put the dumb-dumb breakdown with the riff, and then we [already] had this chorus… it’s funny how those things happen; it’s like a moment in time."

== Composition and lyrics ==
Musically, "Unholy Confessions" is characterized by its "razor sharp" guitar riffs. The song was one of the first Avenged Sevenfold songs to predominantly feature clean singing.The song variously makes used of screamed vocals, chugged breakdowns, harmonized dual lead guitar lines, and choruses. Lyrically, the song is about a couple who find out they are both cheating on each other. According to Metal Hammer, "even the lyrics were metal, managing to make a story seemingly about a shitty relationship sound like something out of a power metal track." M. Shadows said: "I don’t think it was a real-life inspiration, other than things I was dealing with. When you’re a kid, you are just pulling from your own angsty little heart, and that’s kind of what that was." The riff draws influence from the melodic death metal of the 1990s.

Additionally, the track features syncopated patterns in the kick drum work.

== Music videos ==
The band, along with director Thomas Mignone, filmed the song's concept video on December 7, 2003, featuring the band performing the single at an abandoned warehouse. After a few months, they posted on their website's blog about their discomfort with the video, and the decision to re-shoot the video. The concept video eventually got released on YouTube, along with the 2014 re-release of Waking the Fallen.

In February 2004, the band shared the plan to film the new video, which was this time a live performance. The video was directed by Greg Kaplan. The video also features many fans filming at their homes getting ready for the show, whether by promoting, driving to the concert, among other things. The performance was shot on March 6, 2004, at the Henry Fonda Theatre.

== Critical reception and legacy ==
"Unholy Confessions" is widely regarded as one of the band's best songs. In 2020, Louder Sound and Kerrang ranked the song at number six and number two, respectively, on their lists of the 20 greatest Avenged Sevenfold songs.

Bobby Oliver of Alternative Press Magazine wrote: "The riff, the riff, the riff. There are many like it in metalcore, but this one is Synyster Gates’ blazing melody, which announced the shredder’s presence as a blistering force in the band for the next 20 years."

The staff of Metal Hammer called the track an "absolute, iron-clad anthem", and expressed their belief that "for many Avenged fans of a certain age, [the track is] the definitive A7X anthem." They wrote, "A simple song it may have become, but the fact is that 'Unholy Confessions' struck a chord with a young metal crowd that had so far been weaned on nu metal and shiny, Gothenburg-influenced metalcore. Even at that early stage, Avenged felt just a little different from those around them, and the hype train began to roll." According to Avenged Sevenfold frontman M. Shadows, “I wouldn’t say 'Unholy Confessions' is a well-written song by any means. But at the time it worked, and it became what it is... nostalgia!”

The track is routinely used to close the band's live sets. According to Sanders:

"It’s kind of like our 'Hit The Lights'. It’s one of the first things people heard, it’s a throwback at the end. We’ve tried ending with other things but it goes over well and I think it’s one of those things where, at the very end of the night, to throw things back to 2003 or whenever that came out, is pretty cool. There’s no science behind it, it’s just what we do!"

== Track listing ==
12" single

Side A
No.	Title	Length
1.	"Unholy Confessions"	4:43
2.	"Eternal Rest"	5:12

Side B
No.	Title	Length
1.	"Eternal Rest" (Live at the Ventura Theatre; recorded January 3, 2004)	5:16

DVDr

No.	Title	Length
1.	"Unholy Confessions" (Music Video)	4:50

Promo single

No.	Title	Length
1.	"Unholy Confessions"	4:43

== Personnel ==
Credits are adapted from the album's liner notes.

Avenged Sevenfold

- M. Shadows – lead vocals
- Zacky Vengeance – guitars
- The Rev – drums, percussion
- Synyster Gates – guitars
- Johnny Christ – bass guitar

Production

- Andrew Murdock – producer, mixing engineer
- Fred Archambault – co-producer
- THE GATEKEEPERS - recording
- Ai Fujisaki – assistant engineer
- Tom Baker – mastering engineer
- Mike Fasano, Bruce Jacoby, Al Pahanish – drum tech
- Stephen Ferrara – guitar tech
- Larry Jacobson Company – management
- Ryan Harlacher – booking
- Scott Bradford – legal representation

== Certifications ==
Certifications for "Unholy Confessions"
Region	Certification	Certified units/sales
United States (RIAA)	Platinum	1,000,000^{‡}
^{‡} Sales+streaming figures based on certification alone.
