= Keep Your Hands off My Girl =

2007 single by Good Charlotte

"Keep Your Hands Off My Girl"

Single by Good Charlotte

from the album Good Morning Revival
- Released: February 26, 2007
- Length: 3:25
- Label: Epic; Daylight
- Songwriter(s): Joel Madden; Benji Madden
- Producer(s): Don Gilmore

Good Charlotte singles chronology
"The River" (2007)	"Keep Your Hands Off My Girl" (2007)	"Break Apart Her Heart" (2007)

Alternative cover
- Japanese version front cover

"Keep Your Hands Off My Girl" is a song by American rock band Good Charlotte. It was first released on February 26, 2007, in Australia and is the fifth track on their fourth full-length studio album, Good Morning Revival (2007). The song was issued as the first single off the album Good Morning Revival in the United Kingdom and Australia (where it was certified gold). It was not released as a single in North America.

== Music videos ==
A video for the song was posted on the band's Myspace page on October 26, 2006. It was directed by Nylon editor-in-chief Marvin Scott Jarrett, who also directed the band's rockumentary, Fast Future Generation. This video, which consists of the band playing in a white room, was stated as being something they made for the fans. However, it received some airplay on UK music television channels after the decision was made to release "Keep Your Hands off My Girl" as the first single from Good Morning Revival in some territories outside North America. The Album Cover of "Good Morning Revival" is what appears to be a photograph on set from the video shoot.

A second video was made for television. It featured the band playing the song in an underground club, where most of the patrons are women. Originally, this video was played on a few UK channels, but by the start of March, it had replaced the earlier video on most channels. It was also used for the band's content on the Xbox Live Marketplace for their Artist of the Month. Cinematographed by Samuel Bayer (the director of Good Charlotte's "Hold On" video) and directed by Bayer's long-time assistant Brian Lazzaro, the video was featured on an episode of MTV's Making the Video.

The video for "Keep Your Hands Off My Girl" made its debut in the UK on the rock music channel Scuzz on January 17, 2007. On MTV Latin America's Los 10+ Pedidos, the video premiered on February 5, 2007. It reached the top spot on MTV Two's rock chart.

== Track listings ==
CD single

1. "Keep Your Hands Off My Girl" (album version) – 3:25
2. "Face the Strange" – 2:59
3. "I Just Wanna Live" (acoustic version) – 2:46
4. "Keep Your Hands Off My Girl" (Broken Spindles remix) – 4:35
5. "Keep Your Hands Off My Girl" (Street version) (video) – 3:35

7-inch picture disc

A. "Keep Your Hands Off My Girl"
B. "Face the Strange"

== Charts ==
=== Weekly charts ===
Chart (2007)	Peak position
Australia (ARIA)	5
Austria (Ö3 Austria Top 40)	29
Europe (Eurochart Hot 100)	37
Finland (Suomen virallinen lista)	9
Germany (GfK)	32
Greece (IFPI)	43
Ireland (IRMA)	32
Italy (FIMI)	12
New Zealand (Recorded Music NZ)	20
Sweden (Sverigetopplistan)	49
Switzerland (Schweizer Hitparade)	27
UK Singles (OCC)	23

=== Year-end charts ===
Chart (2007)	Position
Australia (ARIA)	37

== Certifications ==
Region	Certification	Certified units/sales
Australia (ARIA)	Gold	35,000^{^}
^{^} Shipments figures based on certification alone.

== Release history ==
Region	Date	Format(s)	Label(s)	Ref.
Australia	February 26, 2007	CD	Epic; Daylight	
United Kingdom	March 12, 2007	7-inch vinyl; CD	Epic; Daylight	
