= M. Shadows =

American heavy metal singer

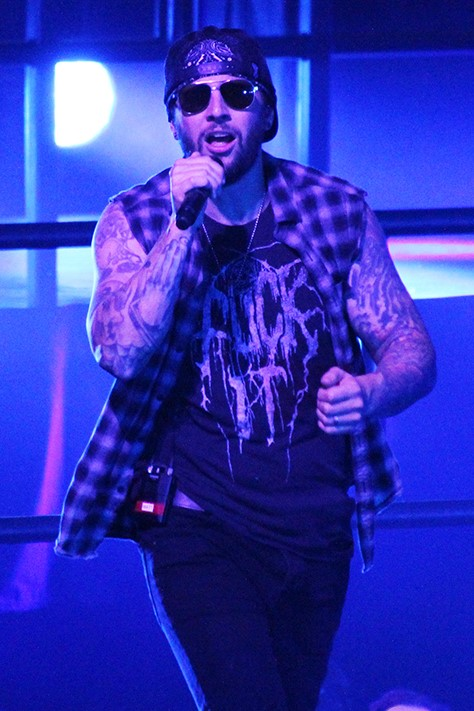
- Shadows performing with Avenged Sevenfold in 2017

Background information
- Born: Matthew Charles Sanders; July 31, 1981 (age 45); Fountain Valley, California, U.S.
- Genres: Heavy metal; progressive metal; hard rock; alternative metal; metalcore (early)
- Occupations: Singer; songwriter
- Years active: 1999–present
- Member of: Avenged Sevenfold
- Formerly of: Successful Failure
- Spouse: Valary DiBenedetto (m. 2009)
- Children: 2
- Relatives: Amy Sanders (sister); Synyster Gates (brother-in-law)

Matthew Charles Sanders (born July 31, 1981), known by his stage name M. Shadows, is an American singer who is the lead vocalist and a founding member of heavy metal band Avenged Sevenfold. In 2017, he was voted third in the list of Top 25 Greatest Modern Frontmen by Ultimate Guitar.

== Early life ==
Matthew Charles Sanders was born on July 31, 1981, in Fountain Valley, California, and raised in Huntington Beach, California. He was raised Catholic. His sister is former WNBA player Amy Sanders. His interest in hard rock was from listening to bands like Guns N' Roses earlier in life after his father gave him his first cassette, and his interest in heavy metal music grew as he became older and began to play the guitar. He links his early musical experience with the piano as a major factor in developing his skills with the guitar and his voice. He attended Huntington Beach High School, where he played for a brief stint in a punk band named "Successful Failure". Following this, Shadows formed Avenged Sevenfold in 1999 along with middle school friends Zacky Vengeance, The Rev, and Matt Wendt. He stated that he became a vocalist solely out of necessity. He said: "I didn't want to be a singer, man. I got forced into it."

== Artistry ==
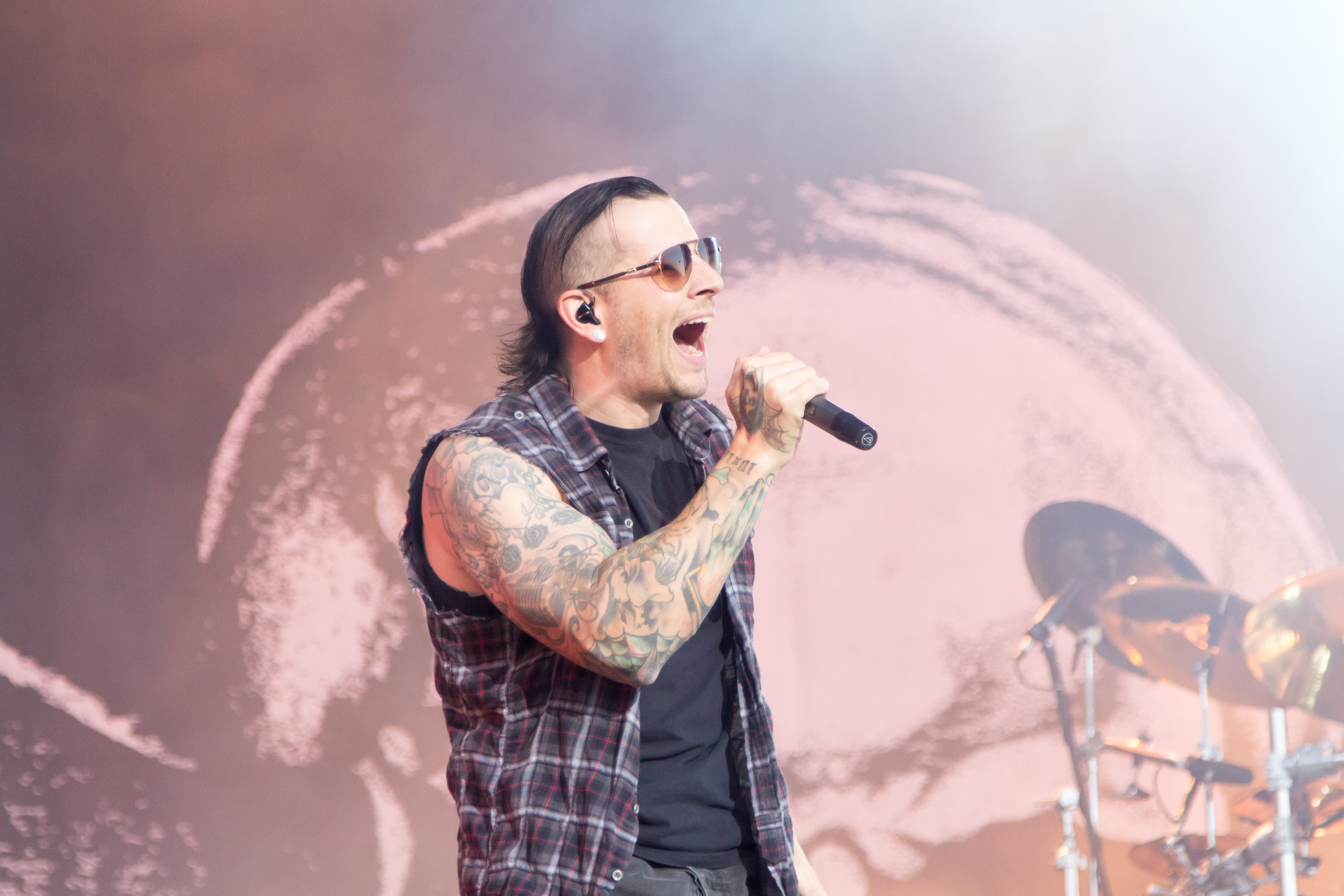
Shadows performing at the Nova Rock Festival in June 2014

=== Vocal style ===
Shadows possesses a baritone voice but is able to sing comfortably in the tenor range, hitting high C on a regular basis. His vocal range spans nearly four octaves, from D2, and reaching up to A5 - Shadows' highest recorded note to date. His vocal style has evolved significantly over the years. On the band's first full-length record, Sounding the Seventh Trumpet, he featured harsh, metalcore-style growls with limited instances of clean vocals. The release of Waking the Fallen in 2003 demonstrated his progression towards melodic vocal lines, but still retained a strong screaming influence. However, the most significant change came with the release of the band's major label debut, City of Evil, in 2005, which featured minimal background screaming, stronger vocal melodies, and increased emphasis on harmonies and melodic hooks. Shadows turned to Ron Anderson, a vocal coach who had previously worked with Axl Rose and Chris Cornell. Shadows was specifically looking to add a more gritty, raspy tone to his voice and worked with Anderson for several months on this before City of Evil was recorded.

The absence of screaming vocals caused rumors that Shadows had lost his ability to scream due to throat surgery needed after Warped Tour 2003. However, producer Andrew Murdock put down these rumors by saying: "When I met the band after Sounding the Seventh Trumpet… Matt handed me the CD, and he said to me, 'This record's screaming. The record we want to make is going to be half-screaming and half-singing. I don't want to scream anymore… the record after that is going to be all singing.'" Shadows explained, "We don't listen to bands that scream. I did when I was in high school and I kind of grew out of it. Maybe I'll listen to one or two. I'd rather listen to the Iron Maidens and Metallicas of the world than the death metal bands. For me, it doesn't make sense."

During an interview with Stevie Rennie in 2014, Shadows mentioned he had intentionally changed his voice to become less raspy and distorted while touring. The change was due to longer live shows lasting from one and a half to two hours in support of Hail to the King. Shadows went on to say that "you better be taking care of yourself or you're gonna be cancelling shows" and "I wanted to hit notes over the rasps".

=== Stage name ===
Shadows, like the other members of Avenged Sevenfold other than Brooks Wackerman, uses a stage name. In an interview, Shadows says that he chose his stage name because he thought of himself as "the darker character in the group". The 'M' is in place of his first name, Matthew, which he did not want to be in his stage name because of the way it sounded. He also added that he and the band took stage names because many other successful musicians that they were influenced by had them (e.g. Slash of Guns N' Roses, Munky of Korn and the members of Slipknot). Shadows also mentioned in another interview their reasoning behind choosing stage names also came from their intention to "piss people off".

== Other projects ==
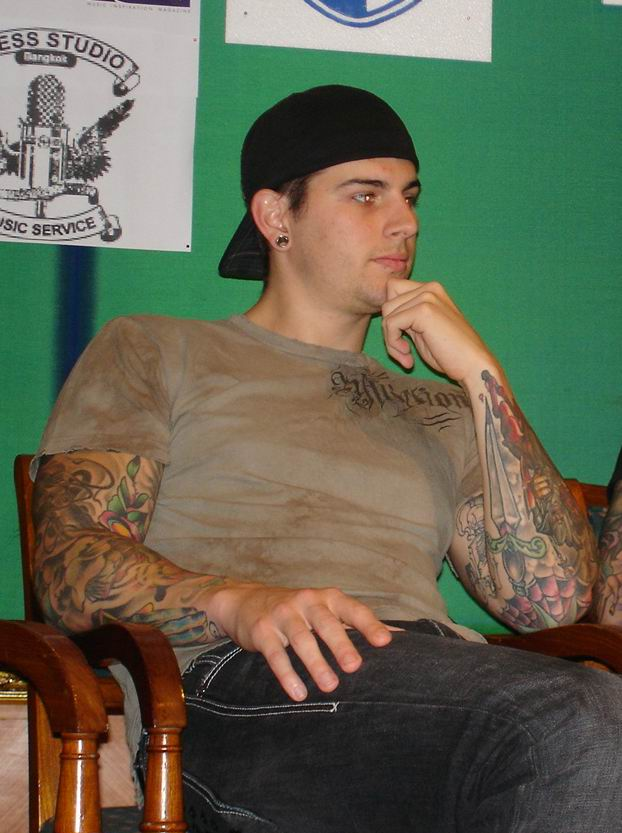
Shadows in August 2007

Shadows has made guest appearances on numerous albums by various artists. He is featured on Steel Panther's 2009 album Feel the Steel and sings a verse of "Turn out the Lights". He also produced The Confession's 2007 album, Requiem, which, according to an interview, M. Shadows was one of the first steps which led to Avenged Sevenfold self-producing their 2007 self-titled album. He also sings in "The River" by Good Charlotte on the album Good Morning Revival along with fellow band member Synyster Gates with his guitar solo. The April 2013 release of Device's self-titled album featured Shadows vocals throughout track 9, "Haze". He also sang "Nothing to Say" in Slash's self-titled solo album, as well as "Go Alone" in Hell or Highwater's debut album. He was also featured on Fozzy's album Sin and Bones singing alongside Chris Jericho in the song "Sandpaper". In 2024, at the last show of NOFX, Shadows joined many other guests on stage to play guitar during "The Decline", the last song ever played live by the band.

Shadows has also been longtime friends with David Vonderhaar of Treyarch, the developers of the Call of Duty: Black Ops video game series, for which Avenged Sevenfold have created four original songs. In 2012, Shadows and Synyster Gates made a brief cameo in Call of Duty: Black Ops II in which they provided the voice over and motion capture of themselves. Also, in June 2013, Shadows competed in the sold out 128-team Call of Duty bracket at MLG Anaheim, placing in the Top 48. In July 2019, Shadows was added as a playable character in Call of Duty: Black Ops 4's "Blackout" battle royale mode.

== Personal life ==
Shadows married Valary DiBenedetto on October 17, 2009. The couple have two sons, River who was born in 2012 and Cash, born in 2014. Shadows' bandmate Synyster Gates is married to DiBenedetto's twin sister Michelle DiBenedetto, making the two brothers-in-law. Shadows also has an younger nephew, Evan M. The lead vocalist of The One Who Falls.

In June 2020, during the George Floyd protests, Shadows published an op-ed piece for Revolver announcing his support for the Black Lives Matter movement. In it, he urged both the rock and metal communities to "reach out and show the compassion that I know is in us all to help raise up our fellow humans". He was especially motivated to write the piece due to the lack of African Americans in the Avenged Sevenfold fanbase.

His favorite artists include Guns N' Roses, Elton John, Pink Floyd, Bad Religion, Pennywise, NOFX, At the Gates, Dream Theater, Helloween, Iron Maiden, Korn, Megadeth, Metallica, Pantera, Queensrÿche, System of a Down, Mr. Bungle, H2O, Rancid, Disembodied, and Knocked Loose.

In March 2022, M. Shadows and Disturbed frontman David Draiman criticized the Florida Parental Rights in Education Act bill quoted, "As a parent of a 7 and 9 year old they have asked about sex and used the word 'gay' in derogatory fashion. Kids are aware at this age so I feel the quicker we explain and show empathy for all people the better… including in school. (I read the full bill.)"

== Discography ==
=== With Avenged Sevenfold ===
- Sounding the Seventh Trumpet (2001)
- Waking the Fallen (2003)
- City of Evil (2005)
- Avenged Sevenfold (2007)
- Nightmare (2010)
- Hail to the King (2013)
- The Stage (2016)
- Life Is But a Dream... (2023)

=== Guest appearances ===
- "Savior, Saint, Salvation" by Bleeding Through (2002; Portrait of the Goddess)
- "Entombed We Collide" and "This Is Not the End" by Death by Stereo (2005; Death for Life)
- "Buffalo Stampede" by Cowboy Troy (2007; Black in the Saddle)
- "The River" by Good Charlotte (2007; Good Morning Revival, also featuring Synyster Gates)
- "Turn Out the Lights" by Steel Panther (2009; Feel the Steel)
- "Nothing to Say" by Slash (2010; Slash)
- "Check the Level" by Dirty Heads (2010; Any Port in a Storm, also featuring Slash)
- "Go Alone" by Hell or Highwater (2011; Begin Again)
- "Sandpaper" by Fozzy (2012; Sin and Bones)
- "Landmine" by Pitch Black Forecast (2012; Burning in Water... Drowning in Flame)
- "Save Me" by Machine Gun Kelly (2012; Lace Up, also featuring Synyster Gates)
- "Haze" by Device (2013; Device)
- "Landmine" by Pitch Black Forecast (2014; As the World Burns)
- "Burn It Down" and "Faint" by Linkin Park, live at the 2017 Chester Bennington memorial concert (also with Synyster Gates on "Faint").
- "Super Hero" by Atreyu (2018; In Our Wake)
- "Street Spirit" by These Grey Men (2020; These Grey Men, a cover of the Radiohead track)
- "Your Name Forever" by Machine Gun Kelly (2025; also featuring Synyster Gates)
