= Andrew Murdock =

American record producer

Andrew Murdock (born January 24, 1962), also known as Mudrock, is an American record producer specializing in rock and metal genres. He is best known for producing Godsmack's Godsmack and Awake albums.

More recently, Murdock has produced American metal band Avenged Sevenfold's albums Waking the Fallen and City of Evil, as well as albums for Slunt, The Riverboat Gamblers, Powerman 5000, a series of singles for hardcore and metal band DYS, whom he also did live sound for in the 1980s, Eighteen Visions, Ünloco, Dave Reffett, Alice Cooper, and 50 Foot Wave's EP Power and Light. He had also contributed to Linkin Park's early Hybrid Theory EP. Murdock has also worked with The Virgin Millionaires.

Murdock grew up in Providence, Rhode Island. Mudrock is based in Los Angeles, and has his own studio in partnership with Scott Gilman, 'The Hobby Shop'. There, Murdock has become involved in the local music community, working with up-and-coming bands, including Dante vs. Zombies, Random Patterns, and Woolen.
