= Fiction (Avenged Sevenfold song) =

Song by Avenged Sevenfold

from the album Nightmare
- Released: July 23, 2010
- Recorded: November 2009 – April 2010
- Studio: The Pass (Los Angeles): Phantom (Westlake Village)
- Length: 5:08
- Label: Warner Bros.
- Songwriter: The Rev
- Producer: Mike Elizondo

Nightmare track listing
- 11 tracks: 1. "Nightmare"; 2. "Welcome to the Family"; 3. "Danger Line"; 4. "Buried Alive"; 5. "Natural Born Killer"; 6. "So Far Away"; 7. "God Hates Us"; 8. "Victim"; 9. "Tonight the World Dies"; 10. "Fiction"; 11. "Save Me"

"Fiction" is a song by American heavy metal band Avenged Sevenfold. It was released on their fifth studio album, Nightmare. The song was written by the band's original drummer Jimmy "The Rev" Sullivan, who died in December 2009. The song is a duet between The Rev and M. Shadows.

== Background ==
On December 28, 2009, the Rev was found unresponsive in his Huntington Beach home, and was later pronounced dead upon arrival to the hospital. Shortly after his death, Avenged Sevenfold dedicated their fifth studio album Nightmare to him.

"Fiction" was the final song The Rev wrote. Parts of "Fiction" were originally written by The Rev for his and bandmate Synyster Gates' project Pinkly Smooth. It was finished only three days before his death, under the title "Death". The demo of the song featured only The Rev, with him performing on vocals, piano and drums. M. Shadows and Gates stated in an interview to Hard Drive Radio:

"The eeriest thing about it is there is a song on the album called 'Fiction' [a nickname the Rev gave himself] which started out with the title 'Death.' And it was the last song The Rev wrote for the album, and when he handed it in, he said, 'That's it, that's the last song for this record.' And then, three days later, he died".

== Recording ==
"Fiction" is one of only two songs featuring The Rev on Nightmare, although his writing and drum arrangements are featured on every song. The song features both The Rev and Shadows on lead vocals. The Rev's favorite drummer, Mike Portnoy (of Dream Theater), was brought on to finish drums on the album. On this song specifically, Portnoy said he "had to play it exactly as (Jimmy) left it."

== Personnel ==
Avenged Sevenfold

- M. Shadows – co-lead vocals, piano
- The Rev – co-lead vocals, drum arrangement
- Johnny Christ – bass guitar

Session musicians

- Mike Portnoy – drums, percussion
- David Palmer – piano
- Stevie Blacke – strings, string arrangement
- Jessi Collins – backing vocals

Production

- Mike Elizondo – producer, keyboards
- Brent Arrowood – assistant engineer
- Chad Carlisle – assistant engineer
- Adam Hawkins – engineer
- Ted Jensen – mastering
- Jodie Levine – production co-ordination, contractor
- Paul Suarez – pro-tools
- Jan Petrow – assistant engineer
- Joanna Terrasi – production co-ordination, contractor
- Andy Wallace – mixer
