= Schecter Synyster Custom-S =

US solid body electric guitar

Schecter Synyster Custom
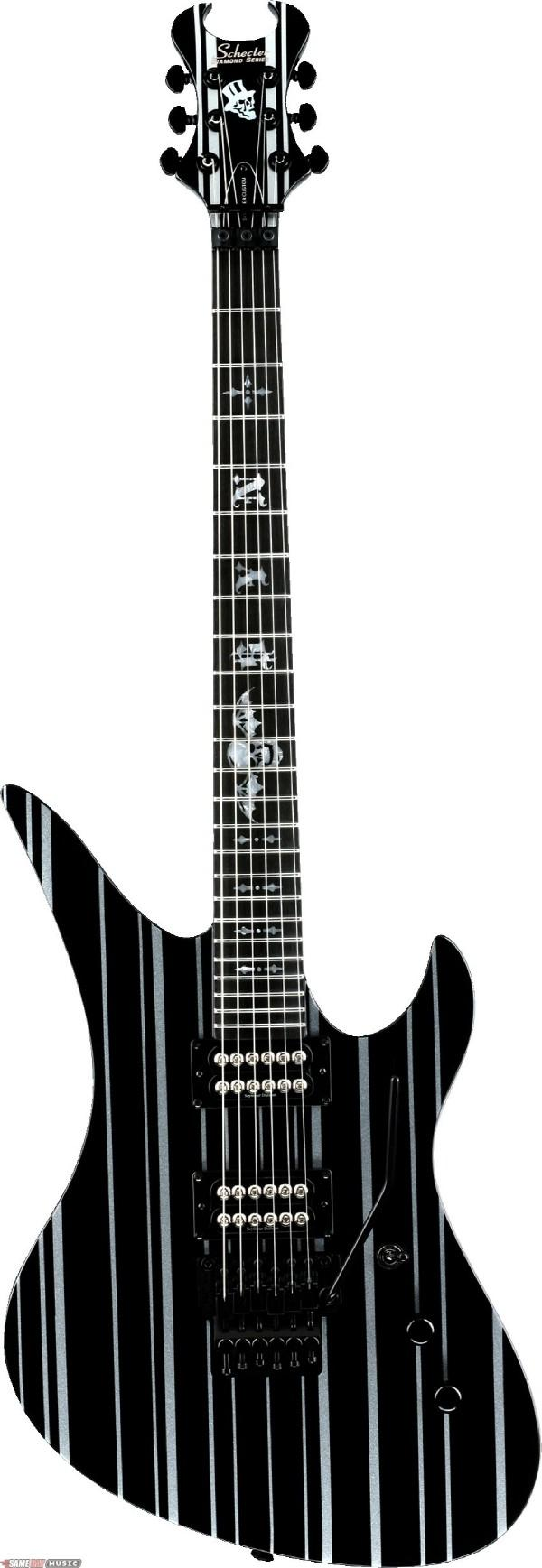
- Schecter Synyster Custom in black and silver
- Manufacturer: Schecter Guitar Research
- Period: 2012-present

Construction
- Body type: Solid
- Neck joint: Set-neck
- Scale: 25.5in

Woods
- Body: Mahogany
- Neck: Mahogany
- Fretboard: Ebony

Hardware
- Bridge: Locking tremolo
- Pickup: Dual Humbuckers

Colors available
- Black, White, Gold or Red with various stripes, Various flags

The Schecter Synyster Custom-S is a solid body, Set neck electric guitar produced by the Schecter Guitar Research. It is the signature guitar of Avenged Sevenfold lead guitarist Synyster Gates. It was introduced in 2012.

The guitar featured a Seymour Duncan Invader SH-8SG humbucking pickup in the bridge position and a Sustainiac in the neck, until around 2018 when they were replaced by Synyster Gates signature Schecter pieces. The guitar has a full set-neck mahogany body, and ebony fingerboard, with a custom horned 3+3 headstock. The body shape is based on the Schecter Avenger.

== Variants ==
Gates' personal examples remained rather basic, with the black with silver pinstripe design being a mainstay for years until Jimmy 'The Rev' Sullivan's passing, when the fretboard inlay was altered to say 'REV', Gates used this guitar on the Nightmare Tour, this variant was never made available to the public, although Gates has occasionally used this guitar live performing So Far Away, a tribute to The Rev. Gates has since diversified his range, now using White with Black, and Gold Burst variants more frequently than the Black with Silver.

== Notable players ==
- Synyster Gates
- Brian Haner
- Herman Li
