= Hail to the King (song) =

2013 single by Avenged Sevenfold

Single by Avenged Sevenfold

from the album Hail to the King
- Released: July 15, 2013
- Genre: Heavy metal
- Length: 5:05 (album version)
- Label: Warner Bros.
- Songwriters: M. Shadows; Synyster Gates; Zacky Vengeance; Johnny Christ
- Producer: Mike Elizondo

Avenged Sevenfold singles chronology
"Carry On" (2012)	"Hail to the King" (2013)	"St. James" (2013)

Music video
- "Hail to the King" on YouTube

"Hail to the King" is a song by American heavy metal band Avenged Sevenfold and the lead single from their sixth studio album of the same name, released on July 15, 2013. The song was premiered live on July 17, 2013, at the Ford Festival Park in Oshkosh, Wisconsin. The single was certified 3× Platinum in the United States on August 23, 2023, Gold in the United Kingdom on November 29, 2024, 4× Platinum in Canada on March 4, 2023, Gold in Denmark on November 22, 2023, and Platinum in New Zealand on December 15, 2022, making it their most successful single in terms of sales internationally.

== Writing and Composition ==
Hail to the King is an anthemic heavy metal track that explores the dark realities of tyranny, systemic oppression, and blind societal obedience to authority. The song tells the story of a tyrannical king who strikes down anyone who opposed him.

The lyrics use dark, violent imagery—such as armored death riding into town, taking rights, and spilling blood—to depict how oppressive rulers enforce absolute submission and fear. The lyric "kneel to the crown" highlights the seductive and dangerous nature of dominance, exposing how easily people surrender their freedom without questioning the power structure above them.

== Release ==
The song was released on July 15, 2013, as the lead single for their sixth studio album, Hail to the King. On July 31, 2013, a limited edition CD version of the single was released, with a live version of "Nightmare" performed at The Palace of Auburn Hills attached.

=== Appearances in media ===
The song appears in video games Rock Band 4, WWE 2K17, and Fortnite Festival, and as one of the official theme songs for WrestleMania 32. The song also appeared in the Netflix film Metal Lords.

== Music video ==
The official music video premiered on the Metal Hammer website on August 16, 2013. The video depicts the band playing together, as well as shots of the king referenced in the song. The video is in black and white and is the first to feature drummer Arin Ilejay, as well as being the first Avenged Sevenfold video to feature a drummer since the video for "So Far Away", which contained archive footage of late drummer the Rev.

== Accolades ==
Accolades for "Hail to the King"
Region	Year	Publication	Accolade	Rank
United States	2015	Loudwire	10 Best Rock Songs of 2013	7

Loudwire Music Awards

Year	Nominee / work	Award	Result
2013	Hail to the King	Best Rock Song	Won

Revolver Golden Gods Awards

Year	Nominee / work	Award	Result
2014	Hail to the King	Song of the Year	Nominated

== Track listing ==
No.	Title	Length
1.	"Hail to the King"	5:04
2.	"Nightmare" (live at The Palace of Auburn Hills, 02/05/2011)	6:22

== Personnel ==
- M. Shadows – lead vocals
- Zacky Vengeance – rhythm guitar, backing vocals
- Synyster Gates – lead guitar, backing vocals
- Johnny Christ – bass
- Arin Ilejay – drums

== Charts ==
=== Weekly charts ===
Weekly chart performance for "Hail to the King"
Chart (2013–2014)	Peak position
Canada Hot 100 (Billboard)	63
Canada Rock (Billboard)	4
Finland (Suomen virallinen lista)	51
Scottish Singles Sales (Official Charts)	72
Taiwan (IFPI Taiwan)	5
UK Singles (Official Charts)	76
UK Rock & Metal (Official Charts)	4
US Billboard Hot 100	83
US Hot Rock & Alternative Songs (Billboard)	12
US Rock & Alternative Airplay (Billboard)	7

=== Year-end charts ===
Year-end chart performance for "Hail to the King"
Chart (2013)	Position
US Hot Rock Songs (Billboard)	29
US Rock Airplay (Billboard)	19

== Certifications ==
Certifications for "Hail to the King"
Region	Certification	Certified units/sales
Canada (Music Canada)	4× Platinum	320,000^{‡}
Denmark (IFPI Danmark)	Gold	45,000^{‡}
New Zealand (RMNZ)	Platinum	30,000^{‡}
United Kingdom (BPI)	Gold	400,000^{‡}
United States (RIAA)	3× Platinum	3,000,000^{‡}
^{‡} Sales+streaming figures based on certification alone.
