= Haner =

Haner may refer to:

- Old Mandarin
- Or HaNer, a kibbutzim of Shaar HaNegev Regional Council, Israel

People with the surname Haner include:

- Brian Haner, American guitarist
- Brian Haner, Jr., better known as Synyster Gates, lead guitarist for Avenged Sevenfold
- Georg Haner, German Lutheran theologist (see German Wikipedia)
