= St. James (song) =

Promotional single by Avenged Sevenfold

from the album Hail to the King (Deluxe Edition) & Diamonds in the Rough
- Released: August 27, 2013
- Recorded: 2012 – 2013
- Studio: Can-Am; (Los Angeles, California); Capitol; (Hollywood, California)
- Genre: Heavy metal
- Length: 5:01
- Label: Warner Bros.
- Songwriter: Synyster Gates
- Producer: Mike Elizondo

Avenged Sevenfold singles chronology
"Hail to the King" (2013)	"St. James" (2013)	"Shepherd of Fire" (2013)

"St. James" is a song by American heavy metal band Avenged Sevenfold. The song is a tribute to the band's late drummer, The Rev, who died in December 2009. The song was released as a promotional single in 2013. It was featured on the deluxe edition of Hail to the King and the reissue of Diamonds in the Rough.

== Background ==
"St. James" was written about Jimmy "The Rev" Sullivan, who was the group's drummer from their inception until his untimely death on December 28, 2009.

"St. James" was first included on the deluxe edition of Hail to the King in 2013. The song was obtainable through a download code included with the album, and also featured the message, "'St. James' is the light to 'So Far Away’s' dark. 'St. James' is a celebration of Jimmy 'The Rev' Sullivan's heart and color and should be listened to with your favorite beverage!”

On February 7, 2020, Avenged Sevenfold re-released their b-sides album "Diamonds in the Rough. "St. James," along with 4 other tracks, were added to the release, which would mark the first time the song had been available on general streaming.

== Personnel ==
Avenged Sevenfold

- M. Shadows – lead vocals
- Zacky Vengeance – rhythm guitar, backing vocals
- Synyster Gates – lead guitar, backing vocals
- Johnny Christ – bass guitar, backing vocals
- Arin Ilejay – drums, percussion

Production

- Mike Elizondo – production
- Brent Arrowood – assistant engineer
- Chris Sporleder – assistant engineer
- D.A. Frizell – illustrations, treatment
- Adam Hawkins – engineer
- Paul Suarez – pro-tools
- Cam Rackman – paintings, portraits
- Andy Wallace – mixer
- Bob Ludwig – mastering engineer

== Charts ==
Chart (2013)	Peak position
UK Rock and Metal	36
US Rock Digital Song Sales (Billboard)	42
US Hard Rock Digital Song Sales (Billboard)	2
