= We Only Come Out at Night =

We Only Come Out at Night may refer to:

- "We Only Come Out at Night", a song by Motionless in White from their album, Creatures
- "We Only Come Out at Night", a song by The Smashing Pumpkins from their album, Mellon Collie and the Infinite Sadness
- "We Come Out at Night", a song by Avenged Sevenfold from their album, Sounding the Seventh Trumpet
