= This Means War =

This Means War may refer to:

== Film and TV ==
- A repeated line in the Groucho Marx film Duck Soup
- A catchphrase of Bugs Bunny
- This Means War (film), a 2012 American action spy film starring Reese Witherspoon, Chris Pine, and Tom Hardy

== Music ==
=== Albums ===
- This Means War (Attack Attack! album)
- This Means War!, an album by Petra
- This Means War (Tank album)

=== Songs ===
- "This Means War", a song by AC/DC on the album Blow Up Your Video
- "This Means War" (Avenged Sevenfold song)
- "This Means War" (Marianas Trench song)
- "This Means War" (Nickelback song)
- "This Means War," a song by Joan Jett from her album Good Music (1986) and the soundtrack for the film Light of Day (1987)
- "This Means War!!" (featuring Ozzy Osbourne), a song by Busta Rhymes from his album E.L.E. (Extinction Level Event): The Final World Front (1998)
