= Hail to the King (Avenged Sevenfold album) =

Studio album by Avenged Sevenfold
- Released: August 23, 2013
- Recorded: 2013
- Studios: Can-Am (Los Angeles); Capitol (Hollywood)
- Genres: Heavy metal; hard rock
- Length: 53:27
- Label: Warner Bros.
- Producer: Mike Elizondo

Avenged Sevenfold chronology
Nightmare (2010)	Hail to the King (2013)	The Stage (2016)

Singles from Hail to the King
- 1. "Hail to the King" Released: July 15, 2013; 2. "Shepherd of Fire" Released: November 7, 2013

Vinyl cover

Hail to the King is the sixth studio album by American heavy metal band Avenged Sevenfold, released on August 23, 2013, through Warner Bros. Records. The album was produced by Mike Elizondo. Hail to the King was the only Avenged Sevenfold album to feature drummer Arin Ilejay, prior to his departure in July 2015. It was also the first Avenged Sevenfold album without musical contributions from Ilejay's late predecessor, Jimmy "The Rev" Sullivan; the bonus track, "St. James", was written in his memory.

The album was a critical and commercial success, reaching number one on the Billboard 200. This marks Avenged Sevenfold's second album to top the Billboard chart (after Nightmare), as well as their first to reach number one in the UK, topping the UK Albums Chart. It also topped the Canadian, Brazilian, Finnish and Irish album charts, and spawned two number one singles on Billboard's Mainstream Rock, "Hail to the King", and "Shepherd of Fire". The former spent 11 weeks on the top of the chart. The album was certified Gold by both the BPI and the RMNZ, and Platinum by both the RIAA and Music Canada.

== Background ==
On November 15, 2012, vocalist M. Shadows said that the band has been working on a new album since the recording of "Carry On" in August 2012. In December, the band said that it plans to begin recording material for their next album in January 2013, with release planned for later in the year. In January 2013 the band started recording their new album. The band started streaming snippets of their new album in May 2013 on their new radio app. It was on the app that Arin Ilejay was confirmed as an official band member and replacement of deceased drummer and founding member The Rev. In an interview with Metal Hammer about the new album, M. Shadows said that the album would sound more blues rock-influenced and more like classic rock and classic metal in the vein of Black Sabbath and Led Zeppelin.

The band released four teasers on YouTube showing the band going through the recording process as well as providing snippets of songs off the album. On June 26, 2013, the band revealed the title, cover art and release date of album. In July, the band revealed the complete track list of the album.

On August 8, 2013, "Shepherd of Fire" was revealed to be the theme song of the Call of Duty: Black Ops II Zombies map "Origins", included in its final downloadable content pack titled Apocalypse.

== Musical style ==
Synyster Gates stated of the album: "I think our songwriting has improved by leaps and bounds. Sonically, this record is our biggest record by far. When you turn this thing on, it blasts your head off." M. Shadows stated about the album's music: "On this record, we want a very bare bones, riff-oriented approach. Because it's really easy for us to say 'That melody would sound great here, throw this background vocal here, here's this harmony.' We had to restrain ourselves from doing that just to keep it more badass and just more straightforward rock."

Zacky Vengeance stated: "We styled everything back and went to the core of heavy metal instead of trying to overcomplicate it. We wrote and wrote, and felt we really achieved what we were going for (...) we're really proud of what we've come up with." Johnny Christ stated about the album's musical style in an interview with BraveWords: "It's definitely us. It's just the next progression. It's probably the heaviest record that we've put out - in its own right. It's been a great response for the single [Hail to the King] so far, which I feel is a good way to see what the rest of the record is going to sound like. There will be some surprises in there for fans, but overall, I'm just excited." He also said the album is more groove metal-oriented. The album also shows a thrash metal sound, with fast to mid-paced tempos, heavily distorted guitars, and war, religious intolerance or corruption themed lyrics.

The album has been compared to bands like Iron Maiden, Metallica, and Pantera.

== Release and promotion ==
On July 15, 2013, the album was made available for pre-order and the title track, "Hail to the King", was released.

The same day, the band revealed a Limited Edition of Hail to the King for pre-order available on their website, much as they did with their previous album, Nightmare. The limited edition set included:

- Limited Edition "Treasure Box": Antique gold colored embossed foil paper wrapped box featuring exclusive Hail to the King artwork
- Deluxe Hail To The King album on CD: Housed in a digi-pak with a card including a download to an extra bonus track
- Exclusive Canvas Print: 11.75″ × 11.75″ Canvas print of the Album Cover artwork, printed and rolled up to fit inside the treasure box
- Photo Book: 11.5″ × 7.125″ 20-page + cover perfect-bound soft-cover book featuring a sampling of photos of the band throughout the years
- Death Bat Challenge Coin: 2″ silver colored metal coin with a design stamped on front & back
- Death Bat Skeleton Key: 4.5″ silver colored metal skeleton key
- Digital Content: Instant download Hail to the King Single. Download of Hail to the King album on street date
- Pre-Sale access to the upcoming Avenged Sevenfold US Tour

On August 19, 2013, the album was made available for streaming on iTunes.

== Critical reception ==
Professional ratings
Aggregate scores
Source	Rating
AnyDecentMusic?	6.7/10
Metacritic	70/100
Review scores
Source	Rating
About.com	4/5 stars
AllMusic	2.5/5 stars
Alternative Press	4/5 stars
Exclaim!	4/10 stars
The Guardian	4/5 stars
Kerrang!	4/5 stars
Loudwire	4.5/5 stars
The New Zealand Herald	4/5 stars
The Oakland Press	3/4 stars
Rolling Stone	3/5 stars

Hail to the King received positive reviews upon release. At Metacritic, which assigns a normalized rating out of 100 to reviews from mainstream music critics, the album received an average score of 70, based on 9 reviews, which indicates "generally favorable" reviews. At AnyDecentMusic?, that collates critical reviews from more than 50 media sources, the album scored 6.7 points out of 10, based on eight reviews.

In a summary of his review, Chris Epting of Loudwire called the album "a modern metal classic that reflects the past while very much embracing the present". Artistdirect's Rick Florino stated, "Hail to the King doesn't just raise the bar for the band, but it raises the bar for everyone else to follow and compete with." In a very positive review, Dom Lawson of The Guardian judged, "Stripped down to a core of thudding Sabbath-like grooves and brash, spiky vocal refrains, Avenged now sound every bit as vital and imperious as the bands they aspire to emulate." "Hail to the King represents a clean sweep, a divergence into classic metal and their best chance of hitting the heights they've always longed for", according to Q. "The next giant crossover metal band has arrived", reviewer Tom Bryant concluded, giving the album a 4 stars out of 5 rating.

Not all critics were as enthusiastic. In a mixed review, Jason Lymangrover of AllMusic remarked: "Unfortunately, once they tried to take inspiration from other bands, they mimicked them so well that they lost their sense of identity in the process". He also accused "This Means War" of ripping off Metallica's song "Sad but True". In a more negative review, Bradley Zorgdrager of Exclaim! said: "After it concludes, Hail to the King makes it challenging for listeners to recall any specific moment, which defeats the purpose of a pop (metal) album".

In a blog post, Machine Head frontman Robb Flynn was also very critical of the album, denouncing it as a mere "cover album" and making several jokes about the similarities a selection of songs share with those by Metallica, Megadeth, and Guns N' Roses. Flynn later revealed he was joking and was actually "happy" for their success, saying "It's time to poke a little fun at A7X." M. Shadows responded to the criticism saying that he "read it as a joke", but noted that "if it is a joke, it was kind of overboard".

=== Accolades ===
Region	Year	Publication	Accolade	Rank
United States	2015	Loudwire	10 Best Rock Albums of 2013	5

Loudwire Music Awards

Year	Nominee / work	Award	Result
2013	Hail to the King	Rock Album of the Year	Nominated
2013	Hail to the King	Best Rock Song	Won

Revolver Golden Gods Awards

Year	Nominee / work	Award	Result
2014	Hail to the King	Album of the Year	Nominated
2014	Hail to the King	Song of the Year	Nominated
2014	M. Shadows	Best Vocalist	Nominated
2014	Synyster Gates & Zacky Vengeance	Best Guitarists	Won
2014	Arin Ilejay	Best Drummer	Won
2014	Johnny Christ	Best Bassist	Nominated

== Commercial performance ==
Hail to the King debuted at number one on the UK Albums Chart on September 1, 2013. It also debuted at number two on the Official Finnish Albums Chart and at number five in Germany.

The album sold 159,000 copies in the United States in its first week of release to debut at number one on the Billboard 200 chart.

== Track listing ==
All songs written and composed by M. Shadows, Zacky Vengeance, Synyster Gates, and Johnny Christ, except where noted.

Standard edition
No.	Title	Length
1.	"Shepherd of Fire"	5:25
2.	"Hail to the King"	5:06
3.	"Doing Time"	3:27
4.	"This Means War"	6:09
5.	"Requiem"	4:23
6.	"Crimson Day"	4:58
7.	"Heretic"	4:56
8.	"Coming Home"	6:26
9.	"Planets"	5:57
10.	"Acid Rain"	6:40
Total length:		53:27

Deluxe version bonus tracks
No.	Title	Lyrics	Length
11.	"Hail to the King" (music video)		5:13
12.	"St. James"	Synyster Gates	5:01
Total length:			63:41

== Personnel ==
Avenged Sevenfold

- M. Shadows – lead vocals
- Zacky Vengeance – rhythm guitar, backing vocals
- Synyster Gates – lead guitar, backing vocals, additional vocals on "Planets", co-lead vocals on "Doing Time"
- Johnny Christ – bass, backing vocals
- Arin Ilejay – drums, percussion

Session musicians

- Storm Lee Gardner – choir vocals on "Requiem"
- Ran Jackson – choir vocals on "Requiem"
- Jessi Collins – choir vocals on "Requiem"
- Sharlotte Gibson – choir vocals on "Requiem"
- Rick D. Wasserman – voice-over on "Requiem"
- Brent Arrowood – sound effects on "Shepherd of Fire"
- Brian Haner Sr – outro guitar solo on "Coming Home"
- David Campbell – orchestral arrangement & conductor
- Suzie Katayama – cello on "Shepherd of Fire", "Requiem", "Crimson Day", "Planets" and "Acid Rain"
- Dane Little, John E. Acosta – cello on "Requiem", "Crimson Day" and "Acid Rain"
- Charlie Bisharat, John Wittenberg, Josefina Vergara, Michelle Richards, Natalie Leggett, Sara Parkins, Songa Lee, Tereza Stanislav – violin on "Requiem", "Crimson Day" and "Acid Rain"
- Ed Meares – upright bass on "Shepherd of Fire", "Requiem" and "Planets"
- John Fumo, Rick Baptist – trumpet on "Shepherd of Fire", "Requiem" and "Planets"
- Jeff Babko – piano on "Acid Rain"
- Alan Kaplan – trombone on "Shepherd of Fire", "Requiem" and "Planets"
- Steven Holtman, Andrew Martin – bass trombone on "Shepherd of Fire", "Requiem" and "Planets"
- Douglas Tornquist – tuba on "Shepherd of Fire", "Requiem" and "Planets"
- Joe Meyer, John Reynolds – horn on "Shepherd of Fire", "Requiem" and "Planets"

Production

- Mike Elizondo – production, keyboards on "Crimson Day", "Heretic" and "Coming Home", sound effects on "Shepherd of Fire" and "Acid Rain"
- Allen Wolfe – A&R
- Joanna Terrasi – A&R
- Brent Arrowood – assistant engineer
- Chris Sporleder – assistant engineer
- D.A. Frizell – illustrations, treatment
- Adam Hawkins – engineer
- Paul Suarez – Pro Tools
- Cam Rackam – paintings, portraits
- Andy Wallace – mixer
- Bob Ludwig – mastering engineer

== Charts ==
=== Weekly charts ===
Chart (2013)	Peak position
Australian Albums (ARIA)	2
Austrian Albums (Ö3 Austria)	3
Belgian Albums (Ultratop Flanders)	23
Belgian Albums (Ultratop Wallonia)	21
Brazilian Albums (ABPD)	1
Canadian Albums (Billboard)	1
Danish Albums (Hitlisten)	6
Dutch Albums (Album Top 100)	6
Finnish Albums (Suomen virallinen lista)	1
French Albums (SNEP)	25
German Albums (Offizielle Top 100)	5
Hungarian Albums (MAHASZ)	8
Irish Albums (IRMA)	1
Italian Albums (FIMI)	8
Japanese Albums (Oricon)	15
Mexican Albums (Top 100 Mexico)	35
New Zealand Albums (RMNZ)	3
Norwegian Albums (VG-lista)	3
Scottish Albums (Official Charts)	1
South Korean International Albums (Circle) Deluxe edition	20
Spanish Albums (Promusicae)	12
Swedish Albums (Sverigetopplistan)	4
Swiss Albums (Schweizer Hitparade)	5
UK Albums (Official Charts)	1
UK Rock & Metal Albums (Official Charts)	1
US Billboard 200	1
US Top Alternative Albums (Billboard)	1
US Top Hard Rock Albums (Billboard)	1
US Top Rock Albums (Billboard)	1

Chart (2025)	Peak position
Greek Albums (IFPI)	77

=== Year-end charts ===
Chart (2013)	Position
Canadian Albums (Billboard)	40
Finnish Albums (Suomen virallinen lista)	6
UK Albums (OCC)	181
US Billboard 200	82
US Billboard Alternative Albums	12
US Billboard Hard Rock Albums	3
US Billboard Rock Albums	16
Chart (2014)	Position
US Billboard 200	88
US Billboard Alternative Albums	12
US Billboard Hard Rock Albums	3
US Billboard Rock Albums	18

== Certifications ==
Region	Certification	Certified units/sales
Canada (Music Canada)	Platinum	80,000^{^}
Denmark (IFPI Danmark)	Gold	10,000^{‡}
New Zealand (RMNZ)	Gold	7,500^{‡}
United Kingdom (BPI)	Gold	100,000^{‡}
United States (RIAA)	Platinum	1,000,000^{‡}
^{^} Shipments figures based on certification alone.^{‡} Sales+streaming figures based on certification alone.

== Release history ==
Region	Date	Label(s)
Australia	August 23, 2013	Warner Bros. Records
Finland	August 23, 2013	Warner Bros. Records
Germany	August 23, 2013	Warner Bros. Records
Malaysia	August 23, 2013	Warner Bros. Records
New Zealand	August 23, 2013	Warner Bros. Records
Netherlands	August 23, 2013	Warner Bros. Records
United Kingdom	August 26, 2013	Warner Bros. Records
Canada	August 27, 2013	Warner Bros. Records
Italy	August 27, 2013	Warner Bros. Records
South Korea	August 27, 2013	Warner Bros. Records
United States	August 27, 2013	Warner Bros. Records
