= Shepherd of Fire =

Single by Avenged Sevenfold

from the album Hail to the King
- Released: November 7, 2013
- Genre: Heavy metal
- Length: 5:25
- Label: Warner Bros.
- Songwriters: M. Shadows; Synyster Gates; Zacky Vengeance; Johnny Christ
- Producer: Mike Elizondo

Avenged Sevenfold singles chronology
"St. James" (2013)	"Shepherd of Fire" (2013)	"The Stage" (2016)

Music video
- "Shepherd of Fire" on YouTube

"Shepherd of Fire" is a song by American heavy metal band Avenged Sevenfold. Released on November 7, 2013, it is the second single from the sixth studio album Hail to the King. The single was a No. 1 single on the US Mainstream Rock charts, their third single to do so.

"Shepherd of Fire" is the theme song of the Call of Duty: Black Ops II Zombies map "Origins", included in the final downloadable content compilation Apocalypse. It is also featured in the mixed martial arts game EA Sports UFC.

== Personnel ==
Avenged Sevenfold

- M. Shadows – lead vocals
- Zacky Vengeance – rhythm guitar, backing vocals
- Synyster Gates – lead guitar, backing vocals
- Johnny Christ – bass guitar, backing vocals
- Arin Ilejay – drums, percussion

Session musicians

- Brent Arrowood – sound effects
- David Campbell – orchestral arrangement and conductor
- Suzie Katayama – cello
- Ed Meares – upright bass
- John Fumo, Rick Baptist – trumpet
- Alan Kaplan – trombone
- Steven Holtman, Andrew Martin, Jaime Ochoa – bass trombone
- Douglas Tornquist – tuba
- Joe Meyer, John Reynolds – horn

Production

- Mike Elizondo – production, sound effects
- Brent Arrowood – assistant engineer
- Chris Sporleder – assistant engineer
- D.A. Frizell – illustrations, treatment
- Adam Hawkins – engineer
- Paul Suarez – pro-tools
- Cam Rackman – paintings, portraits
- Andy Wallace – mixer
- Bob Ludwig – mastering engineer

== Charts ==
=== Weekly charts ===
Weekly chart performance for "Shepherd of Fire"
Chart (2013–2014)	Peak position
Canada Rock (Billboard)	31
Czech Republic Rock (IFPI)	8
Finland (Suomen virallinen lista)	49
UK Rock & Metal (Official Charts)	12
US Hot Rock & Alternative Songs (Billboard)	28
US Rock & Alternative Airplay (Billboard)	9

=== Year-end charts ===
Year-end chart performance for "Shepherd of Fire"
Chart (2014)	Position
US Hot Rock & Alternative Songs (Billboard)	62
US Rock Airplay (Billboard)	29

== Certifications ==
Certifications for "Shepherd of Fire"
Region	Certification	Certified units/sales
New Zealand (RMNZ)	Gold	15,000^{‡}
United Kingdom (BPI)	Silver	200,000^{‡}
United States (RIAA)	Platinum	1,000,000^{‡}
^{‡} Sales+streaming figures based on certification alone.
