= Carry On (Avenged Sevenfold song) =

Single by Avenged Sevenfold

from the EP Black Reign
- B-side: "Instrumental"
- Released: September 24, 2012
- Recorded: August 2012
- Genre: Power metal
- Length: 4:15
- Label: Warner Bros.
- Songwriters: M. Shadows; Zacky Vengeance; Synyster Gates; Johnny Christ
- Producer: Mike Elizondo

Avenged Sevenfold singles chronology
"Buried Alive" (2011)	"Carry On" (2012)	"Hail to the King" (2013)

Audio sample
- file; help

"Carry On" is a song by American heavy metal band Avenged Sevenfold. The song was released on iTunes on September 24, 2012.

== Music style and lyrical themes ==
The song is a fast, up-tempo song inspired by "classic metal" and thrash metal.

In an interview with the band's lead singer M. Shadows about the song's meaning he said, "I wanted to be more vague. Sometimes, I feel like my lyrics meander a little bit, and our songs are so big I need to write more words than are necessary. I wanted to leave these lyrics more open-ended. I felt that the term 'Carry On' was perfect not only for the characters but for AVENGED SEVENFOLD moving forward. I stuck with that. I just wanted to write some epic lyrics you could think about when you were driving down the street or on your horse."

== In popular culture ==
The song plays after the end credits of Call of Duty: Black Ops II in a non-canon music video, showing the band as well as two characters from the game, Raul Menendez (voiced by Kamar de los Reyes) on guitar (guitar played by 'Scarlett') and Sergeant Frank Woods (voiced by James C. Burns) on drums, as the song plays a montage of cutscenes and gameplay elements. It is also used in the reveal trailer for the game's Zombies mode.

== Track listing ==
For Record Store Day 2013, the band released the song on a 12-inch picture disc. The A-side has the album artwork, while the B-side has the band's Deathbat logo in black on a white background.. The numbers '75' and '60' are written above the wings.

12-inch picture disc
No.	Title	Writer(s)	Length
1.	"Carry On"	M. Shadows; Synyster Gates; Zacky Vengeance; Johnny Christ	4.15
2.	"Carry On" (instrumental)	M. Shadows; Synyster Gates; Zacky Vengeance; Johnny Christ	4:15
Total length:			8:30

== Personnel ==
Avenged Sevenfold

- M. Shadows – lead vocals
- Zacky Vengeance – rhythm guitar, backing vocals
- Synyster Gates – lead guitar, backing vocals
- Johnny Christ – bass, backing vocals
- Arin Ilejay – drums

== Charts ==
=== Weekly charts ===
Weekly chart performance for "Carry On"
Chart (2012–2014)	Peak position
Czech Republic Rock (IFPI)	11
UK Physical Singles (OCC)	53
UK Rock & Metal (Official Charts)	2
US Bubbling Under Hot 100 (Billboard)	25
US Heatseekers Songs (Billboard)	18
US Digital Song Sales (Billboard)	70
US Hot Rock & Alternative Songs (Billboard)	20
US Rock & Alternative Airplay (Billboard)	18

=== Year-end charts ===
Year-end chart performance for "Carry On"
Chart (2013)	Position
US Hot Rock Songs (Billboard)	69
