= Welcome to the Family (song) =

Single by Avenged Sevenfold

from the album Nightmare
- Released: October 19, 2010
- Recorded: November 2009 – April 2010
- Genre: Heavy metal
- Length: 4:06
- Label: Warner Bros.
- Songwriters: The Rev; M. Shadows
- Producer: Mike Elizondo

Avenged Sevenfold singles chronology
"Nightmare" (2010)	"Welcome to the Family" (2010)	"So Far Away" (2011)

"Welcome to the Family" is a song by American heavy metal band Avenged Sevenfold. It was released on October 19, 2010, as the second single from their studio album Nightmare. It is the band's second single released without former drummer The Rev, who died on December 28, 2009. In Avenged Sevenfold's "making of" series on YouTube, In the Studio, lead singer M. Shadows and bassist Johnny Christ say that The Rev wrote most of the song and Shadows finished it when they started to record the album. The song is available as DLC in the video game Rock Band 3, and also plays at random during races in the video game Asphalt Legends Unite.

== Track listing ==
1. "Welcome to the Family" – 4:06
2. "4:00 A.M." – 4:58
3. "Seize the Day" (live in Seattle) – 5:37

== Personnel ==
Avenged Sevenfold

- M. Shadows – lead vocals
- Zacky Vengeance – rhythm guitar, backing vocals
- The Rev – songwriting, drum arrangement (tracks 1 and 2), drums and backing vocals (track 3)
- Synyster Gates – lead guitar, backing vocals
- Johnny Christ – bass, backing vocals

Additional musicians

- Mike Portnoy – drums (tracks 1 and 2)

Production

- Mike Elizondo – producer
- Andy Wallace – mixing
- Ted Jensen – mastering
- Cam Rackam – paintings and portraits

== Charts ==
=== Weekly charts ===
Chart (2010–2011)	Peak position
Canada Rock (Billboard)	48
UK Rock & Metal	8
US Alternative Airplay (Billboard)	15
US Bubbling Under Hot 100 (Billboard)	10
US Heatseeker Songs (Billboard)	19
US Hot Rock & Alternative Songs (Billboard)	8
US Mainstream Rock (Billboard)	2

=== Year-end charts ===
Chart (2011)	Position
US Hot Rock & Alternative Songs (Billboard)	30
