= This Means War (Avenged Sevenfold song) =

Song by Avenged Sevenfold

from the album Hail to the King
- Released: August 23, 2013
- Recorded: 2012–2013
- Genre: Heavy metal
- Length: 6:09
- Label: Warner Bros.
- Songwriters: M. Shadows; Zacky Vengeance; Synyster Gates; Johnny Christ
- Producer: Mike Elizondo

"This Means War" is a song by American heavy metal band Avenged Sevenfold from their 2013 album Hail to the King.

Various publications have lambasted the track for its uncanny similarities to Metallica's 1993 single "Sad but True". The song was singled out by Machine Head's vocalist Robb Flynn as a ripoff. Users on Ultimate Guitar voted the song into the site's "Worst Guitar Riffs" list.

Although the song was not released as a single, it placed on several American Billboard rock charts and received a music video. Directed by Andrew Baird, it was released July 5, 2014. The unreleased director's cut of the music video was released in 2017. The song was featured in the video game WWE 2K15.

== Personnel ==
Avenged Sevenfold

- M. Shadows – lead vocals
- Zacky Vengeance – rhythm guitar, backing vocals
- Synyster Gates – lead guitar, backing vocals
- Johnny Christ – bass
- Arin Ilejay – drums

== Charts and certifications ==
=== Weekly charts ===
Weekly chart performance
Chart (2014)	Peak position
Finland Airplay (Radiosoittolista)	44
US Hot Rock & Alternative Songs (Billboard)	36
US Rock & Alternative Airplay (Billboard)	24

=== Year-end charts ===
Year-end chart performance
Chart (2014)	Position
US Hot Rock & Alternative Songs (Billboard)	100

=== Certifications ===
Certifications and sales
Region	Certification	Certified units/sales
United States (RIAA)	Gold	500,000^{‡}
^{‡} Sales+streaming figures based on certification alone.
