= Warmness on the Soul =

EP by Avenged Sevenfold
- Released: April 10 (self-released), June 4, 2001
- Recorded: November 2000, February 2001
- Genres: Metalcore; post-hardcore
- Length: 20:01
- Labels: Good Life Recordings; Lumberjack
- Producers: Donnell Cameron; Avenged Sevenfold

Avenged Sevenfold chronology
Warmness on the Soul (2001)	Eternal Rest/Chapter Four (2003)

Warmness on the Soul is the debut extended play (EP) by the American heavy metal band Avenged Sevenfold. It was released on April 10, 2001, through Good Life Recordings. The release features the video for the title track "Warmness on the Soul" as an enhanced CD bonus. It is the band's first release to feature guitarist Synyster Gates, who joined the band in February 2001. All of the songs were later included on Avenged Sevenfold's debut album, Sounding the Seventh Trumpet, except for the heavy metal version of "To End the Rapture", which was featured on the album's re-release.

Some of the band members' stage names are slightly different compared to their current ones. M. Shadows is simply credited as "Shadows", while Synyster Gates is credited as "Synyster Gaytes".

== Meaning ==
"Warmness on the Soul" is about M. Shadows' girlfriend (now wife), Valary. In an interview, Shadows said the following about the sound: "(We) wanted something really soft to break up the album. A lot of older metal bands did this and we liked the idea, so we just said fuck it and went with it."

== Music video ==
The music video consists of scenes of the band performing, playing near the beach with Zacky Vengeance on lead guitar. The video centers around a woman (M. Shadows' wife) who is looking for the band members, who are wandering through city streets as she searches for them. Then the band walks onto a stage and performs the rest of the song.

== Reception ==
The song was ranked at number 20 on Louder Sound's ranking of the best Avenged Sevenfold songs, and number 18 on Kerrang's.

== Track listing ==
All songs are written by M. Shadows and Zacky Vengeance.

No.	Title	Writer(s)	Length
1.	"Warmness on the Soul (Single Version)"	M. Shadows	4:20
2.	"Darkness Surrounding"		4:50
3.	"We Come Out at Night"		4:45
4.	"To End the Rapture (Heavy Metal version)^{[*]}"	Zacky Vengeance, M. Shadows, Synyster Gates	1:20
5.	"Warmness on the Soul" (music video)	M. Shadows	4:46
Total length:			20:01

* This version was featured on the re-release of Sounding the Seventh Trumpet, replacing the original.

== Personnel ==
Avenged Sevenfold

- Shadows – vocals, acoustic guitar
- Zacky Vengeance – guitars
- Synyster Gates – lead guitar on "To End the Rapture"
- Justin Sane – bass, piano
- The Rev – drums, sound effects

Production

- Recorded at Westbeach in Hollywood, California
- Mastered at Oceanview Mastering
- Avenged Sevenfold – production, engineering, mixing, mastering
- Donnell Cameron – production, engineering, mixing
- Henrah Kruzchev – assistant engineering
- Ramón Bretón – mastering
- Micah Montague – cover art
- Mike Rose – drum technician
