= Buried Alive (Avenged Sevenfold song) =

Promotional single by Avenged Sevenfold

from the album Nightmare
- Released: September 20, 2011
- Recorded: November 2009 – April 21, 2010
- Studio: The Pass (Los Angeles); Phantom (Westlake Village)
- Genre: Heavy metal
- Length: 6:44
- Label: Warner Bros.
- Songwriters: The Rev; M. Shadows; Synyster Gates
- Producer: Mike Elizondo

Avenged Sevenfold singles chronology
"Not Ready to Die" (2011)	"Buried Alive" (2011)	"Carry On" (2012)

"Buried Alive" is a song by American heavy metal band Avenged Sevenfold, off the band's fifth studio album Nightmare. The song was released as the albums fourth and final single on September 20, 2011. The music of the song was mostly written by the band's late drummer, Jimmy "The Rev" Sullivan, who died on December 28, 2009. Singer M. Shadows has stated he is extremely proud of the song.

Loudwire described the song starting out as a power ballad, moving to arena rock, then shifting to fast heavy metal reminiscent of Metallica, with guitar riffs similar to Iron Maiden.

== Music video ==
In September 2011, the band announced plans for an official music video. They tried to get Rob Zombie to direct the video, but he declined due to being focused on another project. A music video never ended up being produced, but on February 14, 2013, an animated lyric video was posted on YouTube.

== Accolades ==
Year	Nominated work	Award	Result
2011	"Buried Alive"	Revolver Magazine's Song of the Year 2011	Nominated

== Personnel ==
Avenged Sevenfold

- M. Shadows – lead vocals
- Zacky Vengeance – rhythm guitar, backing vocals
- The Rev – songwriting, drum arrangement
- Synyster Gates – lead guitar, backing vocals
- Johnny Christ – bass guitar

Session musicians

- Mike Portnoy – drums, percussion

Production

- Mike Elizondo – producer
- Brent Arrowood – assistant engineer
- Chad Carlisle – assistant engineer
- Adam Hawkins – engineer
- Andy Wallace – mixing engineer
- Ted Jensen – mastering engineer
- Jodie Levine – production co-ordination, contractor
- Paul Suarez – Pro Tools
- Jan Petrow – assistant engineer
- Joanna Terrasi – production co-ordination, contractor

== Charts ==
=== Weekly charts ===
Chart (2011)	Peak position
US Hot Alternative Songs (Billboard)	26
US Mainstream Rock (Billboard)	2
US Hot Rock Songs (Billboard)	10

=== Year-end charts ===
Chart (2012)	Position
US Hot Rock & Alternative Songs (Billboard)	59
