= Nightmare (Avenged Sevenfold album) =

- Cover art by Travis Smith

Studio album by Avenged Sevenfold
- Released: July 23, 2010
- Recorded: 2009 – April 21, 2010
- Studios: The Pass (Los Angeles); Phantom (Westlake Village)
- Genre: Heavy metal
- Length: 66:46
- Label: Warner Bros.
- Producer: Mike Elizondo

Avenged Sevenfold chronology
Live in the LBC & Diamonds in the Rough (2008)	Nightmare (2010)	Hail to the King (2013)

Singles from Nightmare
- 1. "Nightmare" Released: May 18, 2010; 2. "Welcome to the Family" Released: October 19, 2010; 3. "So Far Away" Released: April 5, 2011; 4. "Buried Alive" Released: September 20, 2011

Nightmare is the fifth studio album by American heavy metal band Avenged Sevenfold, released on July 23, 2010, through Warner Bros. Records. It was produced by Mike Elizondo, mixed in New York City by audio engineer Andy Wallace, and mastered by Ted Jensen.

Nightmare was Avenged Sevenfold's first album to be recorded without Jimmy "The Rev" Sullivan performing drums due to his death in December 2009. However, he did write parts that were used for the final recordings, making this the last album he would write on until 2023, and his vocal takes are still on the album as a tribute to him. The rest of the drum tracks were handled by Dream Theater drummer Mike Portnoy, who also played with the band for all their tours through the end of 2010. They then hired drummer Arin Ilejay, who played with the band from 2011 to 2015.

The album debuted at number one in the Billboard 200 in the United States and was certified Gold by the BPI and the RMNZ, and Platinum by both the RIAA and Music Canada. By December 2016, the album sold 964,000 copies in the United States, and over a million by April 15, 2021. The cover of the album features a tribute to Sullivan; the tombstone reads "FOREVER" with emphasis on "REV".

== Writing and recording ==
In 2009, during the tour for their self-titled album, Avenged Sevenfold began working on their fifth album. Starting with their last album, the band's drummer, The Rev was contributing much more to songwriting than he had on their first three albums, including their breakthrough album City of Evil (2005). The band stated that the album would be their "most personal and epic that will definitely take you on a very dark journey." By December 2009, the band had completed the demos for it and were ready to hit the studio.

On December 28, 2009, Jimmy "The Rev" Sullivan fatally overdosed. Afterwards, the band suspended work on the album, and even considered breaking up. However, the band eventually decided to resume work on the project after encouragement from Sullivan's parents, as well as knowing he would have wanted them to finish it. Not wanting to hire a permanent replacement for The Rev for the time being, the band selected Mike Portnoy of Dream Theater (a major influence on The Rev and the rest of the band) to finish recording the drum tracks for the album:

Even under normal circumstances, I would've been happy to help the guys out in any way I could as I think Avenged Sevenfold are a great band; But under these incredibly sad and tragic circumstances, I must say I am truly honored to have been asked to play with them and I didn't even have to think twice about saying yes. [...] These guys are a true family and it is an incredibly emotional experience to be here with them for the first time without their lost brother. But they have welcomed me into the family with open arms and there's a real excitement to make the record they had set out to make. I am treating my participation on this album with the utmost respect for Jimmy's memory and am remaining as true as possible to the drum parts that he wrote for the songs and the record he wanted to make. [...] Although I wish I could stay on board with Avenged Sevenfold in a more permanent capacity; I will need to resume work with Dream Theater to start a new album at some point in 2011. However, I will be able to join my brothers in Avenged Sevenfold for at least the duration of their touring throughout 2010, and hopefully this will give them the time to continue to heal and get comfortable back on the road.

After a couple of months, more notices about the album became available; a short message from Zacky Vengeance was posted on the official Avenged Sevenfold Twitter on April 17, 2010: "Tracking is complete. There are no words that will ever describe the feeling of listening to this album while driving home alone at 4 am."

== Release and promotion ==
The album's title track "Nightmare" was leaked on May 6, 2010, on Amazon.com, but was removed soon after. On May 10, a 30-second audio uncensored sample was officially posted to the band's SoundCloud and official website. The same day, the band also posted a video of the song on their official YouTube channel with animated lyrics, which received over 275,000 views in 24 hours. The song was officially released as the album's first single on May 18.

Between May 27 and June 14, the band revealed the album cover piece by piece like a jigsaw puzzle. On the day the cover was completed, they also posted the track listing.

On June 3, 2010, the band announced a "Limited Edition" of Nightmare for pre-order available only on their website, which contained the full album on CD with an expanded booklet that was housed in a leather bound book, a free download of the Nightmare single upon pre-order, and a lithograph entitled Death Bat Anatomy. On June 29, 2010, the album was made available for preorder on iTunes. This digital version featured the main album, the bonus track "Lost It All", "Nightmare" music and lyric videos, as well as behind the scenes footage, sketches and notes for the video and album as a whole.

Three more of the album's songs were previewed online to fans. The track "Buried Alive" was posted on the band's Facebook page on July 14, but experienced loading issues due to a large number of users trying to access the video, and was briefly taken down. The problem was resolved the next day, and a lyric video for the song was simultaneously posted on YouTube. On July 21, "So Far Away" was released to KROQ radio exclusively for one day. "Welcome to the Family" was released to YouTube on July 23 with a now-deleted music video featuring gameplay from Call of Duty: Black Ops.

All three of the previewed songs were later released as official singles: "Welcome to the Family"" was released as the album's second official single on October 19, 2010,"So Far Away" as the third single on April 5, 2011, and "Buried Alive" on September 20, 2011.

"Welcome To The Family" was released as a digital single on December 21, 2010. The single's b-sides were "4:00 AM" (an outtake from Nightmare) and a live version of "Seize the Day" from City of Evil, which features The Rev on drums and backing vocals.

== Music and lyrics ==
The album contains elements of New wave of British heavy metal and hair metal. The music has drawn comparisons to Metallica and Queensrÿche.

Lyrically, the album has been described as "hugely emotional" by Eli Enis of Revolver. Johnny Christ stated in an interview with Ultimate Guitar about the writing process and subject matter of Nightmare:

We definitely had made the decision that it was going to be a concept record. We wanted to have a dark concept record, sort of like The Wall or Operation: Mindcrime. At the same time we wanted to incorporate some of what we had done in the past with the guitar work. We wanted to make it heavier in general. Throughout all of that, the songs that came out were musically already as dark as we wanted them to be. Then lyrically it took a different turn when Jimmy passed. The lyrics then became mostly – not 100 percent – but mostly to do with his death and his life.

M. Shadows and Synyster Gates, in an interview with The Pulse of Radio, confirmed The Rev's special appearance in the record. According to the band members, he left a couple of vocals (to their fortune, clear and in key) before his death, which they used on the record. With his drum fills and vocals intact, the record showed itself to be the band's last record with The Rev. The same band members revealed some details about the new record in an interview to Hard Drive radio:

[...] The new album, Nightmare, is dedicated to The Rev's memory and although it's not exactly a concept album, it does center around The Rev. The eeriest thing about it is there is a song on the album called "Fiction" (a nickname The Rev gave himself) which started out with the title "Death". And it was the last song The Rev wrote for the album, and when he handed it in, he said, 'That's it, that's the last song for this record'. And then, three days later, he died."

Every song on the album had writing contributions from The Rev, and the band has stated that over 60% of the album was written by him.

== Critical reception ==
Professional ratings
Aggregate scores
Source	Rating
Metacritic	62/100
Review scores
Source	Rating
411Mania.com	9.0/10
AllMusic	3/5 stars
The A.V. Club	C−
Billboard	4/5 stars
CraveOnline	1/10
Metal Hammer	8/10 stars
Sputnikmusic	3.0/5
USA Today	3/4 stars

Nightmare received generally positive reviews from music critics. At Metacritic, which assigns a normalized rating out of 100 to reviews from mainstream critics, the album received an average score of 62, based on 7 professional reviews, which indicates "generally favorable reviews".

In the August 2010 issue of Metal Hammer, Terry Beezer rated the album an eight out of ten. In his review, he praised the band members for their courage despite the death of The Rev and called it "the ultimate tribute to a fallen friend." He also praised Mike Portnoy for his part in the album and found him a fitting stand-in for The Rev.

411 Mania gave the record a lengthy and highly positive review by giving it a score of 9.0/10. As a conclusion they stated, "If you're a fan of Avenged Sevenfold, Nightmare is a must-have for you. This album is incredibly moving and is better than any tribute to the late Rev I could have possibly imagined."

Kerrang! gave the album 4 K's out of 5 concluding: "Where Avenged [Sevenfold] go from here is still in the lap of the gods. Whatever their future, though, Nightmare marks the point at which the Huntington Beach crew put away childish things and became men. Wherever he is now, their brother must be immensely proud."

Sputnikmusic gave the album a 3 out of 5. The reviewer praised the second half of the album, but was very critical of the first half, specifically the singles (excluding "So Far Away"). The album has an average fan rating of 3.2/5 on the site.

=== Accolades ===
Year	Nominated work	Award	Result
2010	The Rev on Nightmare	Golden God Awards: Best Drummer	Won
2011	Mike Portnoy on Nightmare	Golden God Awards: Best Drummer	Won
2011	Synyster Gates & Zacky Vengeance on Nightmare	Golden God Awards: Best Guitarists	Won
2011	M. Shadows on Nightmare	Golden God Awards: Best Vocalist	Won
2011	Nightmare	Golden God Awards: Album of the Year	Won
2011	Nightmare	Kerrang! Awards: Best Single	Nominated
2011	Nightmare	Kerrang! Awards: Best Album	Nominated
2011	"Buried Alive"	Revolver Magazine's Song of the Year 2011	Nominated

== Track listing ==
All songs credited to Avenged Sevenfold. Actual songwriters adapted from Tidal and band interviews.

Standard single-disc edition
No.	Title	Writer(s)	Length
1.	"Nightmare"	Matthew Sanders; James Sullivan	6:15
2.	"Welcome to the Family"	Sullivan; Sanders	4:05
3.	"Danger Line"	Sanders; Jonathan Seward; Zachary Baker	5:28
4.	"Buried Alive"	Brian Haner Jr.; Sullivan; Sanders	6:44
5.	"Natural Born Killer"	Sullivan	5:15
6.	"So Far Away"	Haner	5:26
7.	"God Hates Us"	Sanders	5:19
8.	"Victim"	Sanders; Baker; Haner; Seward	7:29
9.	"Tonight the World Dies"	Sullivan; Seward; Sanders	4:41
10.	"Fiction"	Sullivan	5:08
11.	"Save Me"	Sullivan; Sanders	10:57
Total length:			66:46

iTunes deluxe version/Japanese version bonus track
No.	Title	Writer(s)	Length
12.	"Lost It All"	Sanders; Sullivan	3:57
Total length:			70:46

Limited edition Book of Nightmares bonus track
No.	Title	Length
1.	"Nightmare" (Demo)	6:03
Total length:		72:49

Limited edition Book of Nightmares instrumental digital download
No.	Title	Length
1.	"Nightmare" (Instrumental)	6:03
2.	"Welcome to the Family" (Instrumental)	4:07
3.	"Danger Line" (Instrumental)	5:29
4.	"Buried Alive" (Instrumental)	6:46
5.	"Natural Born Killer" (Instrumental)	5:17
6.	"So Far Away" (Instrumental)	5:28
7.	"God Hates Us" (Instrumental)	5:17
8.	"Victim" (Instrumental)	7:31
9.	"Tonight the World Dies" (Instrumental)	4:43
10.	"Fiction" (Instrumental)	5:10
11.	"Save Me" (Instrumental)	10:56
Total length:		66:47

== Personnel ==
Avenged Sevenfold

- M. Shadows – lead vocals, piano
- Zacky Vengeance – rhythm guitar, acoustic guitar, backing vocals
- The Rev – co-lead vocals on "Fiction", growl on "Save Me", drums and backing vocals on "Nightmare" demo
- Synyster Gates – lead guitar, backing vocals
- Johnny Christ – bass

Session musicians

- Mike Portnoy – drums, percussion
- Brian Haner Sr. – guitar solo on "Tonight the World Dies", additional guitars on "So Far Away"
- Sharlotte Gibson – backing vocals on "Victim"
- Jessi Collins – backing vocals on "Fiction"
- David Palmer – piano on "Nightmare", "Danger Line", "Fiction" and "Save Me", keyboards on "Danger Line" and "Save Me", B3 on "Tonight the World Dies" and "Fiction"
- Stevie Blacke – strings, string arrangement on "Nightmare", "Danger Line", "Buried Alive", "So Far Away", "Fiction" and "Save Me"
- Stewart Cole – trumpet on "Danger Line"
- The Whistler – whistling on "Danger Line"

Production

- Mike Elizondo – producer, keyboards on "Fiction"
- Brent Arrowood – assistant engineer
- Chad Carlisle – assistant engineer
- D.A. Frizell – illustrations, treatment
- Adam Hawkins – engineer
- Andy Wallace – mixer
- Ted Jensen – mastering
- Jodie Levine – production co-ordination, contractor
- Clay Patrick McBride – photography
- Paul Suarez – Pro Tools
- Jan Petrow – assistant engineer
- Cam Rackman – paintings, portraits
- Rafa Alcantra – art direction, photography, layouts
- Travis Smith – cover art, tray card art
- Joanna Terrasi – production co-ordination, contractor

== Charts ==
=== Weekly charts ===
Chart (2010)	Peak position
Australian Albums (ARIA)	9
Austrian Albums (Ö3 Austria)	33
Belgian Albums (Ultratop Flanders)	67
Belgian Albums (Ultratop Wallonia)	87
Canadian Albums (Billboard)	2
Dutch Albums (Album Top 100)	47
Finnish Albums (Suomen virallinen lista)	1
French Albums (SNEP)	136
German Albums (Offizielle Top 100)	36
Greek Albums (IFPI)	46
Irish Albums (IRMA)	9
Italian Albums (FIMI)	47
Japanese Albums (Oricon)	12
Mexican Albums (Top 100 Mexico)	35
New Zealand Albums (RMNZ)	2
Norwegian Albums (VG-lista)	14
Scottish Albums (Official Charts)	5
Spanish Albums (Promusicae)	57
Swiss Albums (Schweizer Hitparade)	65
Swedish Albums (Sverigetopplistan)	9
UK Albums (Official Charts)	5
UK Rock & Metal Albums (Official Charts)	1
US Billboard 200	1
US Top Rock Albums (Billboard)	1
Chart (2023)	Peak position
UK Soundtrack Albums (Official Charts)	12
Chart (2026)	Peak position
UK Independent Albums (Official Charts)	47

=== Year-end charts ===
Chart (2010)	Position
US Billboard 200	76
US Top Rock Albums (Billboard)	15

Chart (2011)	Position
US Billboard 200	133
US Top Rock Albums (Billboard)	21

== Certifications ==
Region	Certification	Certified units/sales
Canada (Music Canada)	Platinum	80,000^{^}
New Zealand (RMNZ)	Gold	7,500^{‡}
United Kingdom (BPI)	Gold	100,000^{^}
United States (RIAA)	Platinum	1,000,000^{‡}
^{^} Shipments figures based on certification alone.^{‡} Sales+streaming figures based on certification alone.

== Release history ==
=== CD ===
Region	Date
Austria, Switzerland	July 23, 2010
New Zealand, United Kingdom, Sweden	July 26, 2010
United States, Canada, France	July 27, 2010
Malaysia, Japan	July 28, 2010
Australia	July 30, 2010
Italy, Spain	August 1, 2010
Taiwan	August 17, 2010
Germany, Brazil	August 27, 2010
