= So Far Away (Avenged Sevenfold song) =

Single by Avenged Sevenfold

from the album Nightmare
- Released: April 5, 2011
- Recorded: November 2009 – April 2010
- Studio: The Pass (Los Angeles); Phantom (Westlake Village)
- Length: 5:28 (album version); 4:34 (radio edit)
- Label: Warner Bros.
- Songwriter: Synyster Gates
- Producer: Mike Elizondo

Avenged Sevenfold singles chronology
"Welcome to the Family" (2010)	"So Far Away" (2011)	"Not Ready to Die" (2011)

Music video
- "So Far Away" on YouTube

"So Far Away" is a song by American heavy metal band Avenged Sevenfold, released as the third single for their fifth studio album, Nightmare. The single was released on April 5, 2011, via Warner Bros. Records. The song is a tribute to the band's original drummer Jimmy "The Rev" Sullivan, who died in his sleep on December 28, 2009.

== Writing ==
In the special edition of Revolver magazine that was released the same day as the Nightmare album, Gates stated that he originally started out writing the song "So Far Away" in honor of his grandfather. However, the song is now primarily about his former bandmate, best friend and previous drummer of Avenged Sevenfold, The Rev, who died on December 28, 2009.

During most concerts, the band performs the song as a tribute to the Rev by having the audience hold up their lighters or cell phones during the song as the stage background features a banner commemorating the Rev's legacy.

== Release ==
"So Far Away" was first released by KROQ radio exclusively for one day on July 21, 2010.

In late March 2011, it was revealed that "So Far Away" would be released as the third single from Nightmare. The song starting hitting radio stations April 5, 2011.

== Music video ==
The music video (directed by Wayne Isham) features the four remaining members of the band playing in a studio and also riding in a Cadillac DeVille through a neighborhood (possibly Huntington Beach, where the band originated). Throughout the video, flashbacks of the four play. They are shown as children playing in a garage, then teens playing and hanging out, and stealing beer from a liquor store. There is a scene in the video in which a young Sullivan is depicted riding the handlebars of a bike being ridden by a young M. Shadows, kicking over a metal trash can on the street. Shadows referenced this when talking about Sullivan before playing So Far Away at Rock am Ring 2014. ("we've known this guy since we were this big, rolling round the neighborhood, knocking over trash cans; just being dickheads"). During the bridge, a collection of photos and videos of the Rev play. It ends with a clip of the remaining band members and James embracing.

Avenged Sevenfold posted a countdown on their official website that showed the time until release for a new video for "So Far Away". SFA7X When the video was released, the site crashed due to so many people attempting to watch the video at once. After a second failed attempt to release the video, they solved the problem by hosting the music video on YouTube.

This was the second video not to feature the current drummer for Avenged Sevenfold; the first being Nightmare. For this music video, Synyster Gates uses a custom Schecter guitar, similar to his usual black/silver pinstriped guitar. However instead of the inlays on the fretboard reading "SYN", it displays "REV". Johnny Christ also wore a guitar strap with the word "foREVer" written on it.

== Chart performance ==
The song reached number one on the Billboard Hot Mainstream Rock Tracks chart and peaked at number 15 on the Alternative Songs chart. This is the band's first number-one single.

== Personnel ==
Avenged Sevenfold

- M. Shadows – lead vocals
- Zacky Vengeance – acoustic guitar, backing vocals
- The Rev – drum arrangement
- Synyster Gates – lead guitar, backing vocals, songwriting
- Johnny Christ – bass guitar

Session musicians

- Mike Portnoy – drums, percussion
- Brian Haner, Sr. – additional guitar
- Stevie Blacke – strings and string arrangement

Production

- Mike Elizondo – producer
- Brent Arrowood – assistant engineer
- Chad Carlisle – assistant engineer
- Adam Hawkins – engineer
- Andy Wallace – mixer
- Ted Jensen – mastering
- Jodie Levine – production co-ordination, contractor
- Paul Suarez – pro-tools
- Jan Petrow – assistant engineer
- Joanna Terrasi – production co-ordination, contractor

== Charts ==
=== Weekly charts ===
Chart (2011)	Peak position
Canada Rock (Billboard)	41
Mexican Ingles Airplay (Billboard)	39
US Active Rock (Billboard)	1
US Alternative Airplay (Billboard)	15
US Hard Rock Digital Song Sales (Billboard)	21
US Heritage Rock (Billboard)	6
US Rock & Alternative Airplay (Billboard)	5
US Mainstream Rock (Billboard)	1

=== Year-end charts ===
Chart (2011)	Position
US Hot Rock & Alternative Songs (Billboard)	27
