= Sounding the Seventh Trumpet =

Studio album by Avenged Sevenfold
- Released: July 24, 2001; March 19, 2002 (re-release)
- Recorded: November 2000, February 2001
- Studios: Westbeach Recorders (Hollywood, California)
- Genres: Metalcore; skate punk
- Length: 51:59
- Label: Good Life
- Producers: Donnell Cameron; Avenged Sevenfold

Avenged Sevenfold chronology
Sounding the Seventh Trumpet (2001)	Waking the Fallen (2003)

Singles from Sounding the Seventh Trumpet
- 1. "Warmness on the Soul" Released: April 10, 2001

Sounding the Seventh Trumpet is the debut studio album by American heavy metal band Avenged Sevenfold, released on July 24, 2001, through Good Life Recordings. The album was reissued on March 19, 2002, through Hopeless Records, featuring a slightly different cover art. Although the album only sold 300 copies in its first week of release, it has sold 370,000 copies worldwide, with 310,000 sold in the United States, as of November 2010.

The title 'Sounding the Seventh Trumpet' takes its name from the Book of Revelation, specifically referencing chapter 11 and the sounding of the last (seventh) trumpet, heralding the end of the world. Valary DiBenedetto (M. Shadows' future wife) performs vocals on the track "The Art of Subconscious Illusion." The album was released on vinyl for the first time in 2008 in the US.

== Production ==
Sounding the Seventh Trumpet was recorded in eight days in November 2000, with a budget of only $2,000. When the band members got into the studio, The Rev recorded all the drums in one take, and the other members of the band added their parts to what he had laid down. Zacky Vengeance played lead guitar originally. When Synyster Gates joined the band in early 2001, they recorded a heavy metal version of "To End the Rapture", with Gates playing lead guitar. This version was first seen on the Warmness on the Soul single, and was later featured on the re-release of Sounding the Seventh Trumpet. This is the only album to feature bassist Justin Sane (not to be confused with Justin Sane of Anti-Flag), who also played piano. He was briefly replaced by Dameon Ash during the album's touring cycle, who was then replaced by Johnny Christ.

== Music ==
Dubbed "proto-A7X," the album's sound is characterized as being stylistically "derivative of the goth-leaning metalcore," and as "inflecting the traditional metal sound with outrageous bursts of hardcore fury and mesmerizing wails more likely found in the European vein of death metal." Revolver described the sound as an "often awkward, somewhat schizophrenic hybrid of metalcore and skate-punk."

== Release ==
The release date of this album's initial version is theorized in many sources. On the band's official website, it is given as January 31, 2001. However, on archived versions of the website, news updates explain that the album, distributed by Lumberjack Distributions, was originally planned for a late April 2001 release. Due to unknown reasons, it had to be pushed back multiple times, at first for a June 10, then for a June 20 release. A Loudwire article about the album's 17th anniversary gives July 24 as the actual release date. It was rereleased on March 19, 2002.

== Reception ==
Professional ratings
Review scores
Source	Rating
AllMusic	3/5 stars
Kerrang!	1/5 stars
Ultimate Guitar	8.5/10

Sounding the Seventh Trumpet received mixed to positive reviews from critics. AllMusic rated the album three stars out of five and wrote: "Sounding the Seventh Trumpet is a magnificent album that is suitable for any fan of metal music, as Avenged Sevenfold has a firm grasp on all that is extreme." The review also praised the tracks "Darkness Surrounding" and "We Come out at Night" as being "...excellent metalcore masterpieces, as the vocal harmonies add to these cuts to evolve the songs into fully atmospheric sonic blasts."

== Videography ==
Avenged Sevenfold later released the Warmness on the Soul, which featured a video for the single "Warmness on the Soul". The video depicted the band wandering through city streets as M. Shadows' wife, Valary, searches for them.

== Track listing ==
All songs are written by M. Shadows and Zacky Vengeance, except where noted.

Original release
No.	Title	Writer(s)	Length
1.	"To End the Rapture (Original Piano Version)"		1:22
2.	"Turn the Other Way"		5:37
3.	"Darkness Surrounding"		4:50
4.	"The Art of Subconscious Illusion"		3:46
5.	"We Come Out at Night"		4:45
6.	"Lips of Deceit"		4:10
7.	"Warmness on the Soul"		4:20
8.	"An Epic of Time Wasted"		4:19
9.	"Breaking Their Hold"		1:12
10.	"Forgotten Faces"		3:27
11.	"Thick and Thin"		4:16
12.	"Streets"	Matthew Sanders; Successful Failure	3:07
13.	"Shattered by Broken Dreams"		7:09
Total length:			52:00

2002 reissue
No.	Title	Length
1.	"To End the Rapture (Heavy Metal Version) (Note: The Hopeless Records rerelease features a heavy metal version of "To End the Rapture", featuring new bandmate Synyster Gates on lead guitar.)"	1:23
Total length:		52:00

== Personnel ==
Credits adapted from the album's liner notes.

Avenged Sevenfold

- M. Shadows – lead vocals, acoustic guitar, keyboards
- Zacky Vengeance – guitar
- The Rev – drums
- Justin Sane – bass, piano (Note: Dameon Ash is credited on some pressings, but did not play on the album.)

Session musicians

- Synyster Gates – lead guitar on the re-recorded version of "To End the Rapture"
- Valary DiBenedetto – additional screams on "The Art of Subconscious Illusion"

Production

- Recorded at Westbeach in Hollywood, California
- Mastered at Oceanview Mastering
- Avenged Sevenfold – production, engineering, mixing, mastering
- Donnell Cameron – production, engineering, mixing
- Henrah Kruzchev - assistant engineering
- Ramón Bretón – mastering
- Micah Montague – cover art
- Mike Rose – drum technician

== Charts ==
Chart (2006)	Peak position
Japanese Albums (Oricon)	176
