= Nightmare (Avenged Sevenfold song) =

Single by Avenged Sevenfold

from the album Nightmare
- Released: May 18, 2010
- Recorded: November 2009–April 2010
- Genre: Heavy metal; alternative metal
- Length: 6:16 (album version); 5:09 (radio edit)
- Label: Warner Bros.
- Songwriters: M. Shadows; The Rev
- Producer: Mike Elizondo

Avenged Sevenfold singles chronology
"Crossroads" (2008)	"Nightmare" (2010)	"Welcome to the Family" (2010)

Music video
- "Nightmare" on YouTube

"Nightmare" is a song by American heavy metal band Avenged Sevenfold. It was released on May 18, 2010, as the lead single for their fifth studio album of the same name.

== Overview ==
Lyrically, "Nightmare" deals with an individual who is damned for his wrongdoings on earth. The song is sung from the point of view of a resident of hell, who may have once been a living person too, mocking the other character and pointing out that it's his own fault he's in hell. It is their first single released without former drummer The Rev, who died on December 28, 2009. The song was released digitally on May 18 and 21, 2010 on the US and worldwide, respectively, on iTunes as well as an animated lyric video on YouTube, which received over 275,000 plays in 24 hours. A preview for the song was released on May 6, 2010, on Amazon.com, but was removed soon after for unknown reasons. However, on May 10, 2010, a 30-second audio uncensored sample was again revealed, but this time at SoundCloud.

"Nightmare" was nominated for Best Single at the Kerrang! Awards 2010, but lost to Liquid Confidence by You Me at Six. The song is also one of Avenged Sevenfold's best known, and has been certified 2× Platinum by the RIAA.

"Nightmare" was released on July 27, 2010, as a downloadable track in Rock Band 2 along with Seize the Day and Scream. It was discovered by fans that the face of Jimmy "The Rev" Sullivan, the band's deceased drummer, can be seen on both the single and album cover. "Nightmare" is an Easter egg in the video game Call of Duty: Black Ops. It is accessible by completing the "One Giant Leap" Achievement or Trophy. The song was released for Rocksmith on October 30, 2012. It was also added on Fortnite Festival.

== Reception ==
The song was the No. 1 most added track at Active Rock radio in the US during one week of May 2010 and sold over 23,000 units in its first day. The song became the most Radio Played rock song in 2010, with over 35,000 spins. In Burrn! magazine's 2010 Readers Pop Poll, it was chosen as Best Tune.

In 2020, Louder Sound and Kerrang! ranked the song at number three and number four, respectively, on their lists of the 20 greatest Avenged Sevenfold songs.

== Music video ==
The band has filmed a music video for "Nightmare". To film the video, they hired the famed video director, Wayne Isham, who has worked with bands such as Mötley Crüe, Bon Jovi and Metallica. The video itself was filmed at Linda Vista Community Hospital in Los Angeles, California. The music video premiered on July 17, 2010, on MTV2, at 11 am EST, and on Avenged Sevenfold's website. An unedited version of the video premiered later on that day. The video can be seen on the band's official YouTube page.

The video depicts lead vocalist M. Shadows about to undergo surgery, when the surgeons take him out of the room on a gurney and wheel him through the hallway of the hospital. Shadows then notices the torn-down former drum kit of the band's deceased drummer, The Rev, when he toured with them to support their record City of Evil. The surgeons move him through halls and he sees the members of Avenged Sevenfold acting mentally insane, such as rhythm guitarist Zacky Vengeance convulsing on the floor in a straitjacket (and later waltzing with a skeleton), lead guitarist Synyster Gates continually banging his bloodied forehead against the window of a door, and bassist Johnny Christ crawling on the ceiling with a skeleton, as well as disturbing images of children playing and soaked in blood. The video shifts between these scenes and scenes of the band performing in a black room with a small amount of background light. Towards the end of the video, M. Shadows begins to fight the gurney, wanting to get off, as they wheel him toward a room being led by two young boys. He cannot get off because he is strapped to it. He is wheeled into a room, where the last drum set The Rev toured with Avenged Sevenfold with is set up with a light behind it, morphed into The Rev's figure.

The video does not feature Mike Portnoy playing drums; this was decided by Portnoy himself as he wanted it to be all about Avenged Sevenfold and seeing as how The Rev wrote most of the drums for the album. Portnoy thought it would be wrong to have himself in the video. The music video is heavily based on the infamous scene from Jacob's Ladder where Jacob Singer, played by Tim Robbins, is being pulled through a hospital on a stretcher. The band used Jacob's Ladder as inspiration for the video because they knew it was one of The Rev's favorite movies.

Many homages and tributes are shown throughout the video. For instance, The Rev's City of Evil tour drum kit has tarantulas crawling on it, just like in the "Afterlife" video, where a spider crawls across The Rev's face (additionally, while filming the "Afterlife" video, The Rev stated he had arachnophobia). Another example is during the scene of Zacky Vengeance waltzing with a skeleton. This is also shown in the "Afterlife" video, where he is dancing with his then girlfriend (and later wife). Other smaller references to Avenged Sevenfold's videos are The Priest from "Seize the Day" and patients faces stretching, like in the "Bat Country" video.

== Track listing ==
1. "Nightmare" – 6:16
2. "Nightmare" (Demo) – 6:05
3. "Nightmare" (Instrumental) – 6:03

== Personnel ==
Avenged Sevenfold

- M. Shadows – lead vocals, piano
- Zacky Vengeance – rhythm guitar, backing vocals, acoustic guitar
- The Rev – drums, backing vocals on "Nightmare" demo, drum arrangement
- Synyster Gates – lead guitar, backing vocals
- Johnny Christ – bass

Session musicians

- Mike Portnoy – drums, percussion
- David Palmer – piano
- Stevie Blacke – strings, string arrangement

Production

- Mike Elizondo – production
- Craig Aaronson – A&R
- Brent Arrowood – assistant engineering
- Chad Carlisle – assistant engineering
- D.A. Frizell – illustrations, treatment
- Adam Hawkins – engineering
- Andy Wallace – mixing
- Ted Jensen – mastering
- Jodie Levine – production co-ordination, contractor
- Clay Patrick McBride – photography
- Andy Olyphant – A&R
- Paul Suarez – Pro Tools
- Jan Petrow – assistant engineering

== Charts ==
"Nightmare" debuted and peaked at number 51 on the Billboard Hot 100. However, on the week ending August 14, 2010, the song re-entered at number 83 due to the release of the album. It is the band's highest-charting song in the United States and Canada.

=== Weekly charts ===
Chart (2010)	Peak position
Canada Hot 100 (Billboard)	48
Canada Rock (Billboard)	43
Czech Republic Rock (IFPI)	2
Scottish Singles Sales (Official Charts)	58
UK Singles (Official Charts)	65
UK Rock & Metal (Official Charts)	2
US Billboard Hot 100	51
US Hot Rock & Alternative Songs (Billboard)	3
US Alternative Airplay (Billboard)	12
US Mainstream Rock (Billboard)	2

=== Year-end charts ===
Chart (2010)	Position
US Hot Rock Songs (Billboard)	15

== Certifications ==
Region	Certification	Certified units/sales
New Zealand (RMNZ)	Gold	15,000^{‡}
United Kingdom (BPI)	Gold	400,000^{‡}
United States (RIAA)	2× Platinum	2,000,000^{‡}
^{‡} Sales+streaming figures based on certification alone.
