= Schecter Guitar Research =

US guitar, bass and amplifier manufacturer

- Type: Subsidiary
- Industry: Musical instruments
- Founded: 1976; 50 years ago in Van Nuys, California, United States
- Founder: David Schecter, Herschel Blankenship and Shel Horlick
- Headquarters: 1840 Valpreda Street; Burbank, California 91504; United States
- Area served: Worldwide
- Key people: List: David Schecter (founder); Herschel Blankenship (founder); Shel Horlick (founder); Hisatake Shibuya (distributor/owner); Michael Ciravolo (president); Marc LaCorte (Vice President)
- Products: Electric and acoustic guitars, basses, amplifiers, effects units
- Owner: Hisatake Shibuya
- Subsidiaries: List: Foxgear Pedals; Baroni Lab Pedals; Wylde Audio; Guru Pedals
- Website: schecterguitars.com

Schecter Guitar Research, commonly known simply as Schecter, is an American manufacturing company founded in 1976 by David Schecter, which originally produced only replacement parts for existing guitars from manufacturers such as Fender and Gibson. Today, the company mass-produces its own line of electric and acoustic guitars, basses, amplifiers, and effects units through its own brand and four subsidiary companies.

== History ==
=== Custom shop days, 1976-1983 ===
In 1976, David Schecter opened Schecter Guitar Research, a repair shop in Van Nuys, California. The shop manufactured replacement guitar necks and bodies, complete pickup assemblies, bridges, pickguards, tuners, knobs, potentiometers, and other miscellaneous guitar parts. Contrary to popular belief, Schecter never supplied parts to Fender or Gibson. By the late 1970s Schecter offered more than 400 guitar parts, but did not offer any finished instruments.

In 1979, Schecter offered, for the first time, its own fully assembled electric guitars. These guitars were custom shop models based on Fender designs. They were considered of very high quality and expensive, and were sold only by twenty retailers across the United States.

Schecter guitars and parts have been used by, among others, Prince, Rick Parfitt, Robert Smith, Simon Gallup, Porl Thompson, Yngwie Malmsteen, Michael Anthony, John Norum, Gary Holt, Steve Lukather, Pete Townshend, Jeff Loomis, Mark Knopfler, Gustavo Cerati, Ritchie Blackmore, Chris Poland, East Bay Ray, Synyster Gates, Zacky Vengeance, Richard Patrick, Jinxx, Jake Pitts, Tommy Victor, Dan Donegan, Lou Reed, Todd Rundgren, Robin Zander, Rodrigo Amarante, Tony Maue, Shaun Morgan, Nelfo Alfonsin and Nikki Sixx.

=== Texan ownership and mass production, 1983-1987 ===
By 1983, Schecter had reached its custom shop production limit and could no longer meet demand. That year, the company was purchased by a group of Texas investors who wanted to build upon Schecter's reputation for quality. The investors moved the company to Dallas, Texas, where they produced guitars using both imported parts and Schecter parts under the Schecter name for less than five years.

At the January 1984 NAMM Show, Schecter introduced twelve new guitars and basses, all based on Fender designs. The most popular of these guitars was a Telecaster-style guitar similar to those that Pete Townshend played. Although Townshend never endorsed this model, it was known unofficially as the "Pete Townshend model". Eventually, the Telecaster-style guitar became known as the "Saturn", and the company's Stratocaster-style guitar became known as the "Mercury". All guitars from these years have the "lawsuit" peg heads (two small marks on back of headstocks). Schecter was still using Stratocaster and Telecaster headstocks, which Fender had allowed when Schecter was a parts company.

During this period, Schecter managed to sign a famous endorsee, the Swedish guitarist Yngwie Malmsteen. Schecter built several custom guitars for Malmsteen that featured his signature scalloped necks and reverse headstocks. Malmsteen soon took up a custom model of the similar Fender Stratocaster.

=== Shibuya Hisatake and reform, 1987-present ===
In 1987, the Texas investors sold the company to Shibuya Hisatake, a Japanese entrepreneur who also owned the Musicians Institute in Hollywood and ESP Guitars (to this day, Schecter Guitar Research and ESP Guitars have remained separate entities). Shibuya moved the company back to California and returned Schecter to its custom shop roots, devoting all its efforts to manufacturing high-end, expensive custom instruments.

Schecter guitars were once again only available from a few retailers, one of them being Sunset Custom Guitars in Hollywood, which Hisatake Shibuya also owned, and where Michael Ciravolo, the future president of Schecter Guitar Research, worked. During 1994/1995 Schecter managed to sign another famous endorsee, the Swedish guitarist John Norum.

In 1995, Schecter introduced its 'S Series' guitars and basses, which were Fender-style instruments. In 1996, Shibuya asked Ciravolo to become Schecter's president and run the company. Ciravolo, an experienced musician, brought to the company many well-known musicians as endorsees, including Robert DeLeo of Stone Temple Pilots, Jay Noel Yuenger (whose Teisco Spectrum 5 served as a model for J's stage guitars) and Sean Yseult of White Zombie, and Xavier Rhone.

Ciravolo had never really liked Fender designs, so he sought to distance the company from its Fender-style models. To that end, he added the Avenger, Hellcat, Hollywood Classic CT, and Tempest models to the Schecter catalog. He also wanted to reach a new generation of musicians he felt were ignored by most major guitar manufacturers. Yet, at this time (1996-2000), the company was producing only expensive, custom shop models of a quality not seen since the company's early days under Dave Schecter, whose maximum output was forty guitars a month, all custom made.

Ciravolo, seeking a U.S. factory that could mass-produce Schecter guitars while maintaining the quality standards of the U.S. custom shop, met with several Asian guitar manufacturers at the Tokyo Music Festival and subsequently decided on a factory in Incheon, South Korea. Thereafter, Schecter's guitars were built in the South Korea factory, shipped to the U.S., and set up in a Schecter shop. At the 1998 summer NAMM Show, Schecter introduced the Diamond Series, which included six affordably priced non-custom guitars, including a seven-string guitar, the A-7. In 2000, Schecter introduced the C-1, debuted by Jerry Horton in Papa Roach's "Last Resort" music video. The Diamond Series is still in production.

=== Expanded custom shop, return of USA production, and Schecter Amplification, 2013–present ===
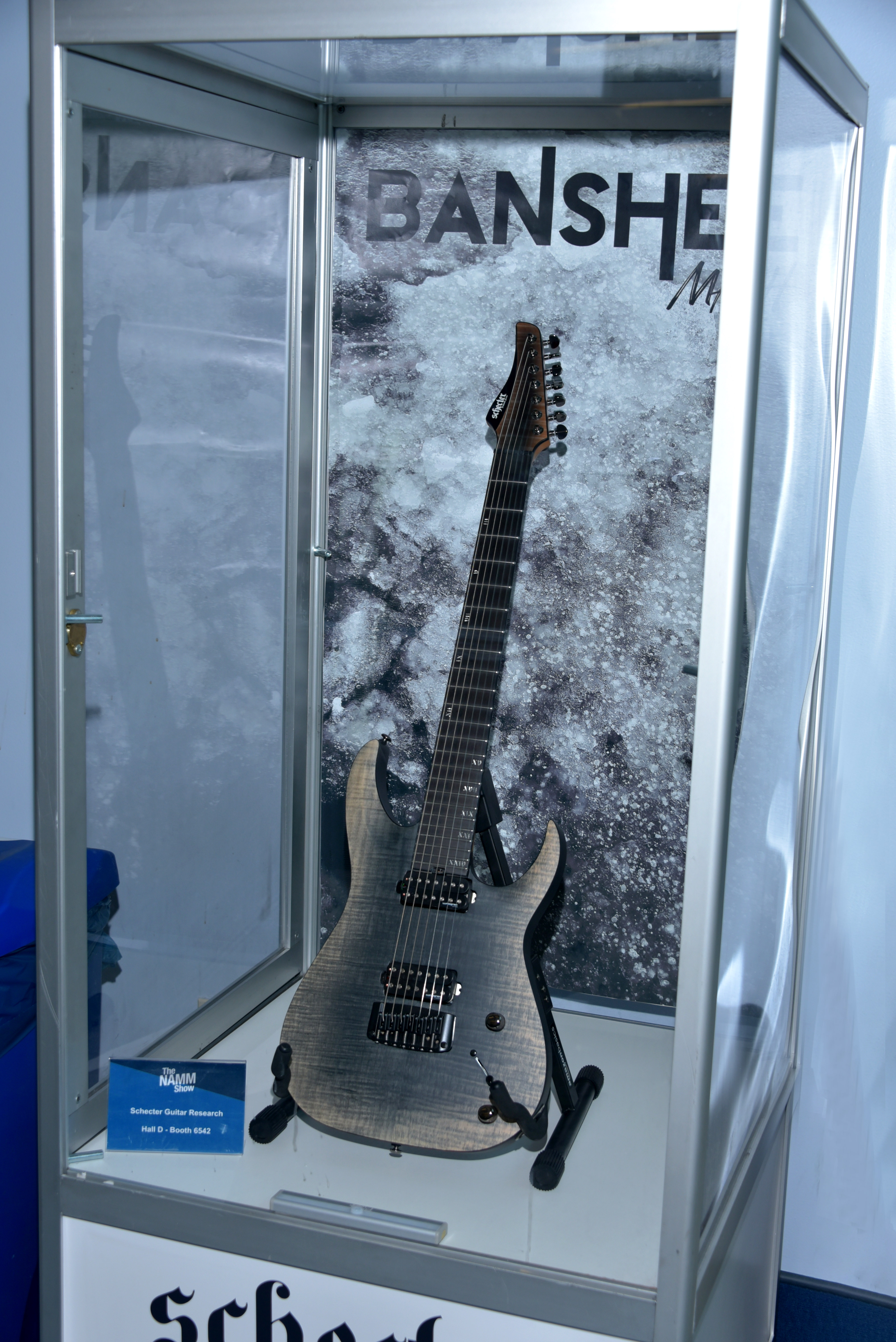
Schecter Guitar Research display at 'The NAMM Show' Jan. 17, 2020

In 2012, Schecter expanded its custom shop, adding 14,000 square feet, several Haas Automation CNC machines, and a new 1,500-square-foot spray booth, and announced a new line of U.S.-built guitars called the "USA Production Series." These guitars were officially debuted at the NAMM Show in 2013. Schecter also announced a new line of hand-wound electric guitar and bass pickups to be used on USA Production and custom shop models and perhaps sold as parts.

At the same show, Schecter announced their introduction into the amplifier market, debuting amps designed in part by the designer James Brown, known for designing the Peavey 5150 amplifier with Eddie Van Halen and a line of effects pedals under the Amptweaker name. The amps first announced were the Hellraiser USA 100, Hellraiser Stage 100, Hellwin USA 100, and Hellwin Stage 100, the USA series built in Schecter's U.S. shop and the Stage series overseas. The Hellwin is the signature amp for the Avenged Sevenfold guitarist Synyster Gates, who helped design the head with James Brown. Both Hellwin and Hellraiser amps use EL34 power tubes, an on-board noise gate, a passive and active input that compensate for the output difference by changing the circuit instead of reducing output, and a Focus control that adjusts the low end response; the main difference is the Hellwin's use of MIDI controllers. The Hellwin is also a three-channel amp, as opposed to the Hellraiser's two-channel design.

Schecter also introduced a line of speaker cabinets, one, called the Depth Charge, featuring a 200W sub-woofer to increase the cabinet's bass response.

== Diamond Series ==
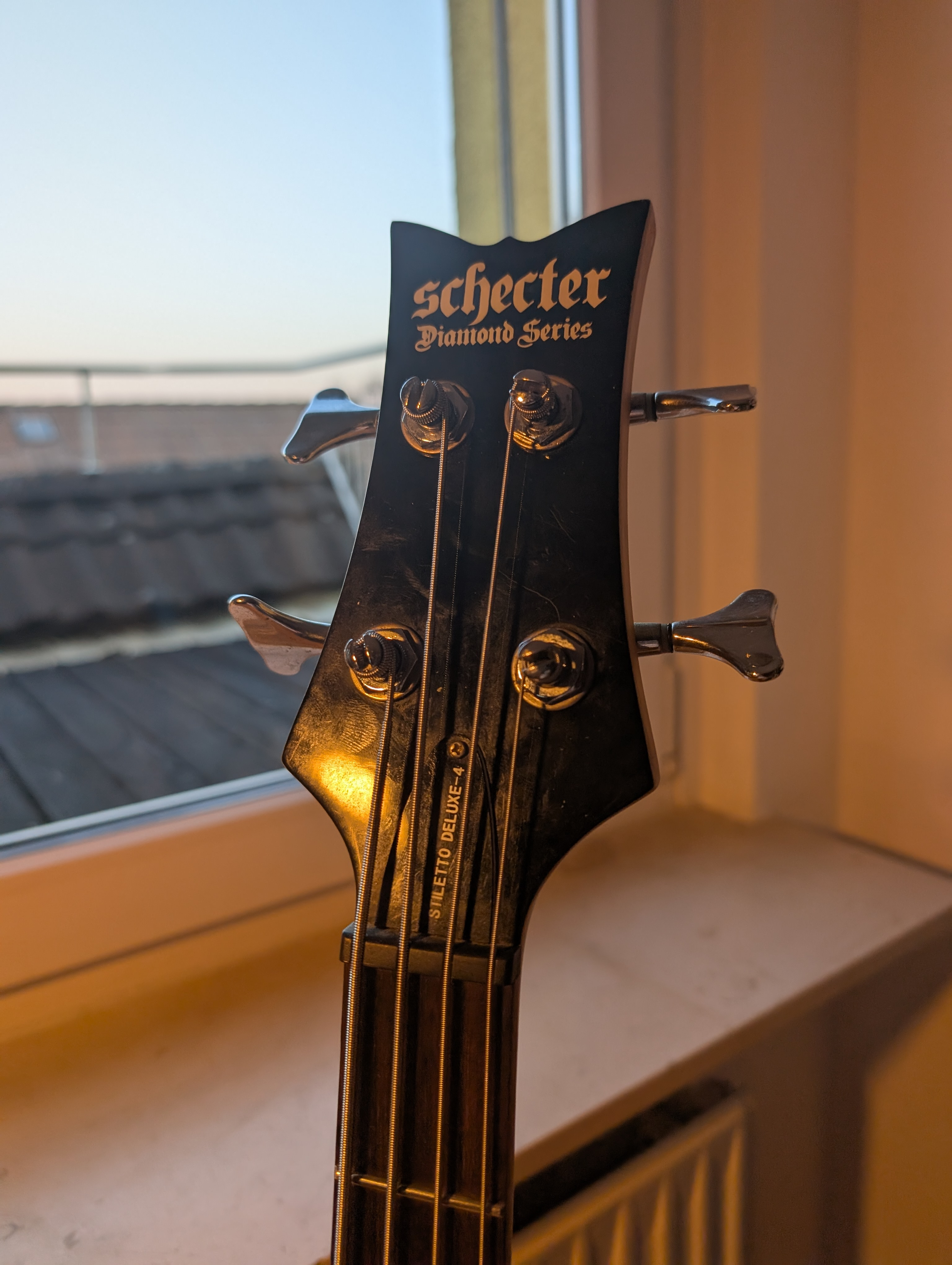
Headstock of Schecter bass guitar Diamond stiletto deluxe 4

The Diamond Series, introduced in 1998, consists of all the non-custom, mass-produced Schecter models, and is further divided into groups of guitars that share common design characteristics. Although there are a large variety of models available in the Diamond range, many have parts from different Schecter guitar lines. For example, all Omen, C, Hellraiser and Damien basses have the same body shape, although they have different finish colors and different woods and some have set rather than bolt-on necks. The many different Diamond Series guitars made from a smaller number of core parts allow guitarists to find a Schecter to fit their requirements, although Schecter will not customize any Diamond guitar.

Some of the best-known guitars made by Schecter are the 'C Series' in various models, such as the Hellraiser and Blackjack, and the S Series, which include the S-1 Elite (double cut) and the less fancy S-1. The Elite versions of Schecter's mass-produced instruments often include an arched top, abalone binding, a bound fretboard, and a bound headstock with a finish matched to the body. Pickups on mass-produced Schecter models are almost always "Duncan-Designed" humbuckers, which are based on Seymour Duncan's specifications, usually with a 'push-pull' control that splits the full humbucker pickup sound into the sharper tone of a single coil pickup.

Schecter targeted specific market segments with occasional limited runs of its mass-produced guitar models in novelty finishes. The 'Aviation Series', which appeared around 2006 and ran for about a year, equipped certain mass-produced model bodies (the PT, Tempest, S-1, etc.) with World War II U.S. (and British) aircraft colors and markings, and special pickup covers that look like cooling louvers.

Schecter also makes seven-string models, eight-string models and recently, nine-string models. Schecter's 'Diamond series' guitars use components such as TonePros locking bridge products on non-tremolo models and original Floyd Rose double locking tremolos on many of the six and seven string models. Many models also feature USA EMG or Seymour Duncan pick-ups and Grover tuners.

== Products ==
=== Guitars ===
The following list of guitars are correct as appears on the Schecter Website

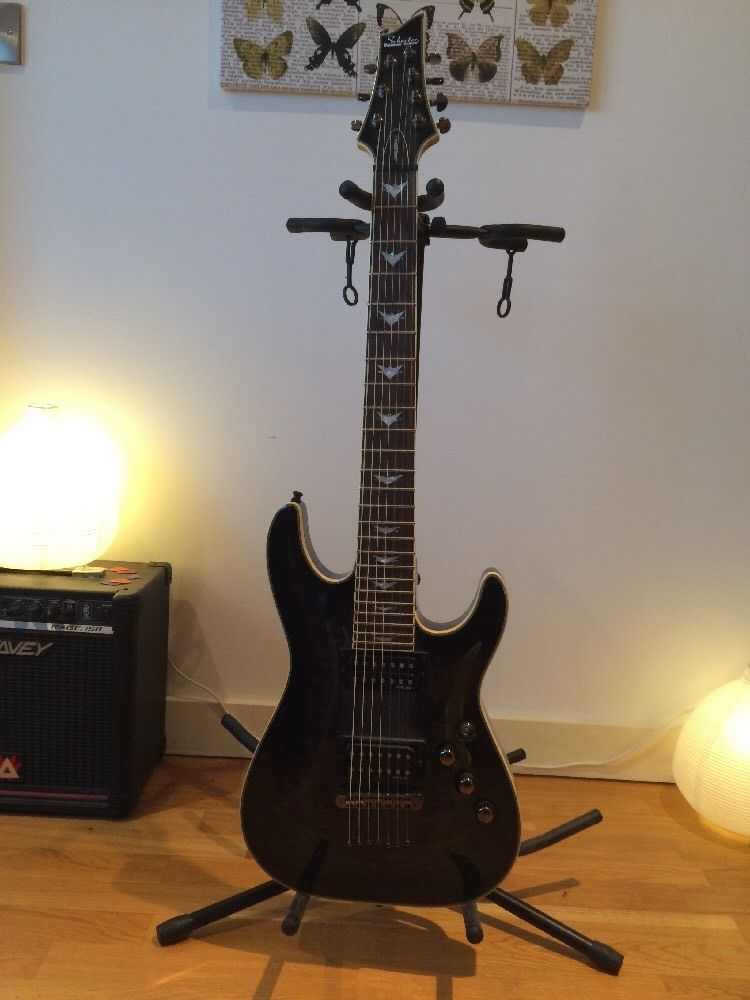
A Schecter Omen Extreme (7 String) Guitar

- C Series = C-1, C-1 Artist, C-1 Blackjack, C-1 Silver Mountain, C-1 Silver Mountain FR-S, C-1 Classic, C-1 Blackjack EX Baritone, C-1 Elite, C-1 Exotic Star, C-1 FR, Schecter C-1 Hellraiser FR, C-1 Lady Luck, C-1 Platinum, C-1 Plus, C-1 SheDevil, C-1 SheDevil FR, C-7, C-7 Blackjack, C-7 FR, C-1 XXX, C-8 Hellraiser, C-1 custom
- S Series = S-1, S-1 Blackjack
- Tempest Series = Hellraiser Tempest, Tempest Blackjack, Tempest Classic, Tempest Custom, Tempest Extreme (Excluding USA). Tempest-7
- 00 Series = 006 Deluxe, 006 Extreme (Excludes USA), Hellraiser 006, 007, 007 Elite
- S-1 Tribal = Devil Tribal Delux, S-1 Scorpion Tribal Deluxe (Excludes USA)
- Devil Series =Devil Custom, Devil Spine
- Hollywood Series = Hollywood Classic
- Stargazer Series = Stargazer, Stargazer 12
- Sunset Series = Hellraiser Sunset FR, Sunset Deluxe
- Stiletto Series = Stiletto 6 FR, Stiletto Classic
- PT Series = PT, PT Fastback, Pete Dee Signature
- Hellcat Series = Hellcat VI
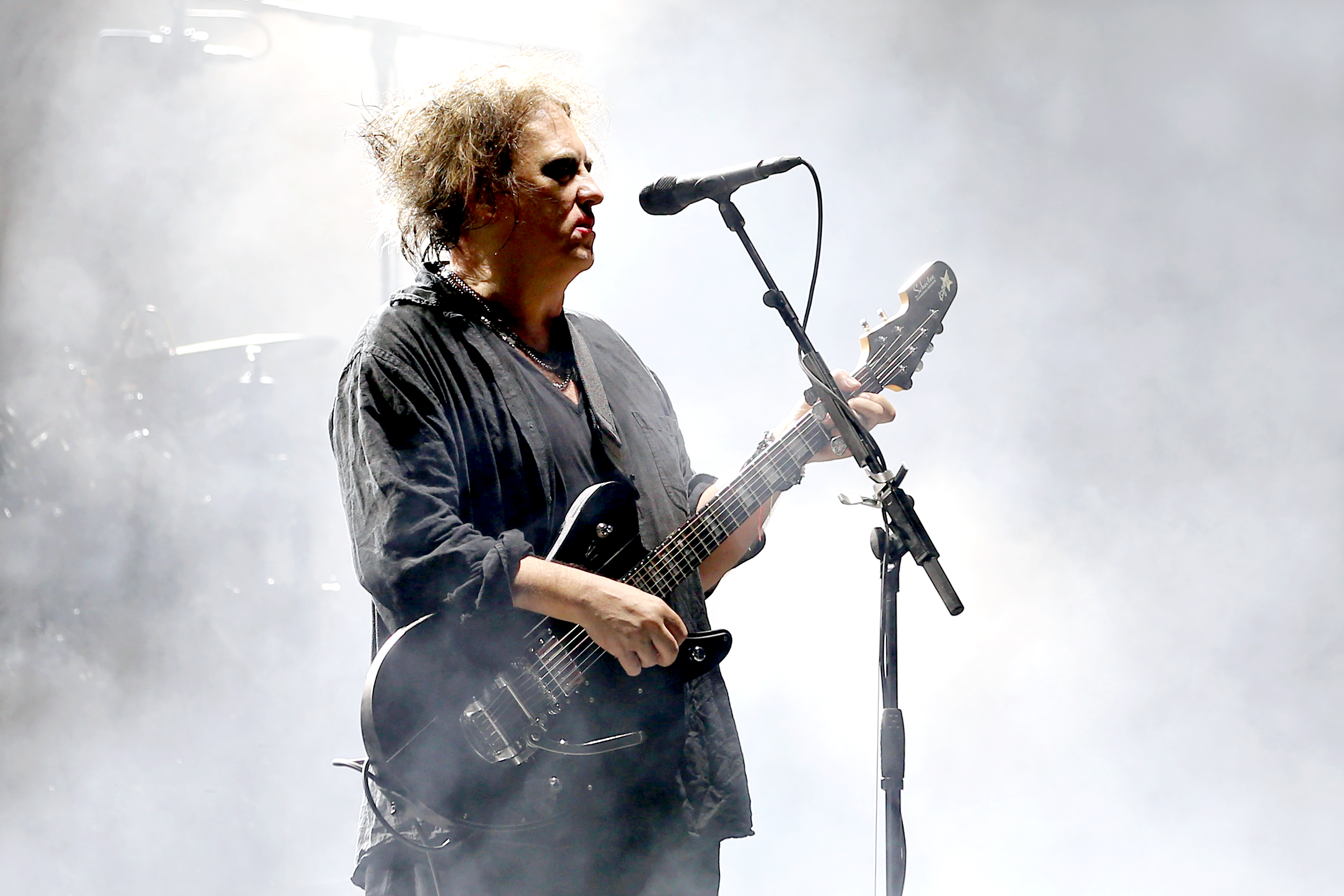
- Robert Smith with his artist model
  Ultra Series = Ultra III, Ultra Classic, Ultracure (Robert Smith signature model), Ultra VI Bass/Baritone
- Artist Models = Loomis 7 and 7 FR (Jeff Loomis), Porl Thompson Model (Porl Thompson), RS-1000 and Ultracure (Robert Smith), Simon Gallup Ultra Spitfire (Simon Gallup), Synyster Standard, Custom, Deluxe and Special (Synyster Gates), Vengeance Custom and ZV Blade (Zacky Vengeance), Pete Dee Model (Pete Dee), Jake Pitts C-1 FR (Jake Pitts), Jinxx Recluse-FR (Jinxx), Al Jourgensen Signature Triton (Al Jourgensen) Machine Gun Kelly PT, Jack Fowler Traditional, Nick Johnston Traditional, Keith Merrow KM6 and KM7, Michael Anthony Model T, Nikki Sixx Sixx bass and J4 Sixx, dUg Pinnick DP4 and DP12, DJ Ashba Signature, Jerry Horton Tempest, Kenny Hickery C1 Sustainiac, Chris Howorth V-7, Randy Weitzel V-7, Robin Zander Corsair, Dale Stewart Avenger 4, and Johnny Christ Signature.
- Extreme Series = 006 Extreme (Excludes USA), Omen-6 Extreme (Excludes USA), Omen-6 FR, Omen-6 FR Extreme, Omen-7 Extreme, Tempest Extreme
- Banshee Series = Banshee Extreme, Banshee Elite
- Demon = Demon, Demon-FR, Demon-7, Demon-7 FR
- Hellraiser Series = Hellraiser 006, Hellraiser Avenger, Hellraiser C-1, Hellraiser C-1 FR, Hellraiser C-7, Hellraiser C-7 FR, Sunset Hellraiser FR, Hellraiser Tempest, Hellraiser V-1, Hellraiser V-1 FR, Hellraiser C-8 LIMITED EDITION, Hellraiser DLX
- Blackjack Series = C-1 Blackjack, S-1 Blackjack, C-1 Blackjack ATX, C-1 Blackjack ATX FR, C-1 Blackjack FR, C-1 Blackjack EX Baritone, C-7 Blackjack, C-7 Blackjack ATX, Tempest Blackjack, V-1 Blackjack ATX, V-1 Blackjack ATX FR, V-1 Blackjack, Blackjack ATX C-8
- Avenger = Avenger, Avenger FR LIMITED EDITION
- Omen Series = Omen Solo-6, Omen-6, Omen-6 Extreme, Omen-6 FR (Excludes USA), Omen-6 FR Extreme (Excludes USA), Omen-7, Omen-7 Extreme (Excludes USA), Omen-8
- Damien Series = Damien-6, Damien-6 FR, Damien-6 LH, Damien-6 FR LH, Damien Platinum-6, Damien Platinum-6 FR, Damien Platinum-6 FR S, Damien Platinum-6 LH, Damien Platinum-6 FR LH, Damien Platinum-6 FR S LH, Damien-7, Damien-7 LH, Damien Platinum-7, Damien Platinum-7 LH, Damien Platinum-8, Damien Platinum-8 LH, Damien Platinum-9
- V Series = V-1 Classic, Hellraiser V-1, Hellraiser V-1 FR, Blackjack ATX V-1, Blackjack ATX V-1 FR, Blackjack V-1, Damien V-1, Damien V-1 FR, Hellraiser V-7, Hellraiser V-7 FR, Hellraiser V-8
- Solo Series = Solo-6 Classic, Hellraiser Solo-6, Hellraiser Solo-6 FR LIMITED EDITION (2009)
- Semi/Hollow Body = Corsair, Corsair Bigsby, TSH-1, TSH-1 Classic
- 7 Strings = C-7 Blackjack, Damien-7, Hellraiser C-7, Loomis-7, Loomis-7 FR, Omen-7, Omen-7 Extreme, 007, 007 Elite, C-7 Diamond Deluxe, Tempest-7
- Baritones = C-1 Blackjack EX Baritone
- Sun Valley Super Shredder Series = FR, FR S, PT FR
- Sun Valley Super Shredder III = 6, 7 String
- Apocalypse Series = C-1 Red Reign, C-1 Red Reign FR S, C-7 Red Reign, C-7 FR S Red Reign, Solo-II Red Reign, Solo-II FR Red Reign, V-1 Red Reign, V-1 FR Red Reign, C-1, C-1 EX, C-1 FR, C-1 FR S, C-7, E-1, PT, V-1
- SGR Series (Import line) = 006 FR SGR, Avenger SGR, Banshee-6 FR SGR, Banshee-6 SGR, C-1 FR SGR, C-1 SGR, C7 SGR, S1 SGR

=== Acoustics ===
The following list of acoustics are correct as appears on the Schecter Website (Accessed 25 February 2012):

- Royal Acoustic
- Orleans Acoustic
- RS-1000 (Robert Smith signature model)
- GLP-1 (Grant Lee Phillips signature model)
- Hellraiser Studio Acoustic
- Hellraiser Stage Acoustic
- Omen Extreme Acoustic

=== Basses ===
The following list of basses are correct as appears on the Schecter Website (Accessed 18 December 2008):

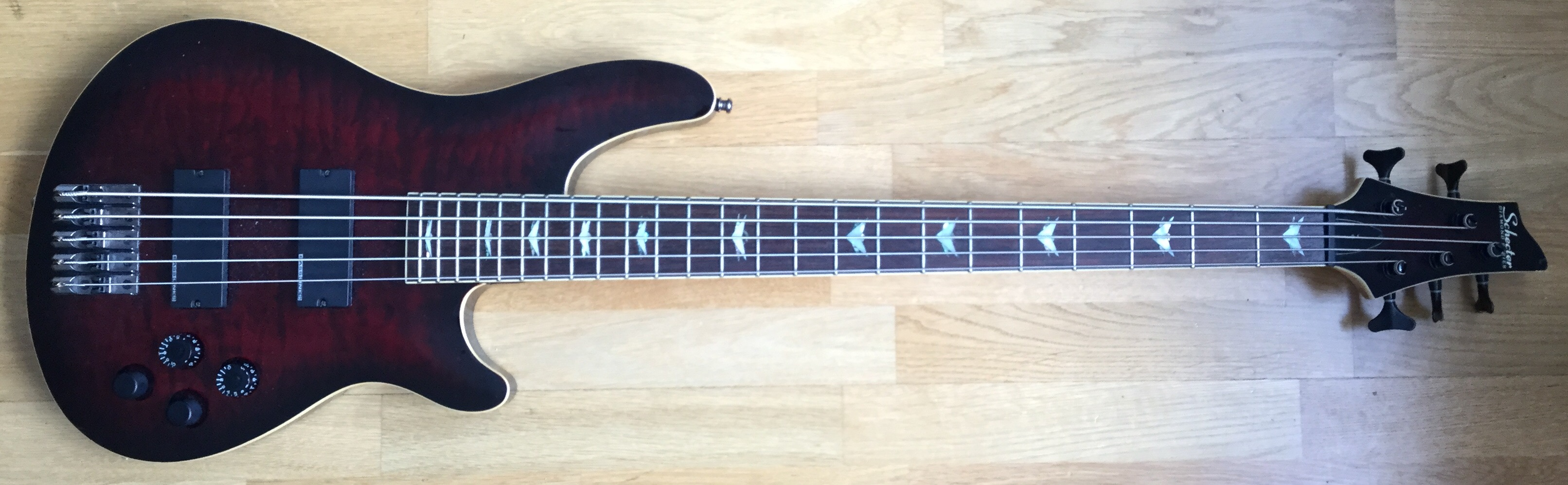
A Schecter C5 Bass

- 00 Series - 004 Series
- C Series - C-4, C-5
- Damien Series - Damien-4, Damien-5
- Diamond J - Diamond J-4, Diamond J-5
- Elite series - Elite-4, Elite-5
- Extreme Basses - Stiletto Extreme-4, Stiletto Extreme-5
- Hellraiser Series - Hellraiser-4, Hellraiser-5
- Model-T - Model-T
- Omen Series - Omen-4, Omen-5, Omen-8
- Riot series - Riot-4, Riot-5, Riot-6
- Stargazer Series - Stargazer-4, Stargazer-5
- Stiletto Series - Custom-4, Custom-5, Custom-6, Deluxe-4, Deluxe-5, Elite-4, Elite-5, Stealth-4, Stealth-5, Stiletto Extreme-4, Stiletto Extreme-5, Stiletto Stage-4, Stiletto Stage-5, Studio-4, Studio-5, Studio-6, Studio-8

=== Amplifiers ===
- Hellraiser
- Hellwin

== Discontinued instruments ==
The following instruments are no longer in production by Schecter Guitars as of 2012. Although, some guitars, like the Damien-7, The Banshee Elite, and Hellcat VI have been brought back for 2016 and are currently available to purchase on Schecter's official website.

Guitars

- Banshee
- 00 Series = 006 Elite (2008), 007 Elite (2000–2007)
- C Series = C-1 Classic, C-1 Tremolo (2006 Only), C-1 Jolly Roger (2005 Only), C-1 30th Anniversary Model (2006 only), C-1 Exotic (2005–2006 only), C-1 Custom XXX (2005 only), C-1 Shedevil, C-1 Shedevil FR (only 100 made, 2009) C-1 E/A (2008), C-1 Elite (2008), C-1 Special (2007), C-1 Stealth, CB-2000 Celloblaster, C-7 Plus (discontinued), C/SH-1 (2007), C/SH-12 (2007 only), C-1 +
- S Series = S-1 DLX, S-1 PLUS (2001–2002), S-1 30th Anniversary Model (2006 only), S-1 Elite (2008), S-1 Hot Rod, S-1 Scorpion Tribal Doubleneck, S-1 "Bada Bling", S-1 "Black Widow" (2005 only), S-1 "The Devil's Rejects" (2007 only), S-1 "Vampira" (2003 only), S-1 Blackjack (2004).
- Hellraiser Series = Avenger Hellraiser FR (available exclusively at Drum City – GuitarLand, Inc. And 30 White models were made for special order through any authorized Schecter retailer in 2010)
- Avenger Series = Avenger "The Texas Chainsaw Massacre: The Beginning" (made only in 2007)
- Banshee Series = Banshee (2007)
- Gryphon Series = Gryphon Limited Edition (2008), Gryphon-7
- Hellcat Series = Hellcat (2008)
- Hot Rod Series = Hot Rod '39
- Artist Series = Jerry Horton C-1, Jerry Horton Tempest (2007 Only), PT 30th Anniversary Model (2006 only), PT Custom, Synyster Custom (White w/ Gold Stripes, only 100 made), Vengeance Special (2008), Vengeance Standard (Zacky Vengeance signature model, 2007 only), Pete Dee Diamond Series (White on Black, Black on White)
- PT Series = PT Elite, PT Blackjack
- Aviation Collection = PT "Flying Tiger" (2004 only), PT "Bomber Girl" (2004 only), S-1 "RAF Spitfire" (2006 only), Tempest "Midway" (2006 only), PT "Bottoms Up!" (2006 only), Ultra "P-51" (2006 only), Tempest "A-10 Warthog" (2007 only), Ultra "F-117 Stealth" (2007 only)
- Tempest Series = Tempest 30th Anniversary Model (2006 only), Tempest Deluxe, Tempest Special (only made in 2003), Tempest "New Orleans Saints NFL Katrina Relief" (only made in 2005), Traditional 30th Anniversary (2006 only), Tempest Extreme
- TSH-1
- Unknown Series = V-7, A-5X Celloblaster, A-7, SW-3500 (2007), T-1M33

Hollowbody

- Jazz Series
- Jazz Elite (last made in 2005)
- Jazz-6 (last made in 2002)
- Jazz-7 (last made in 2001)

Acoustics

- SW-Classical
- SW-1000
- SW-2000
- SW-2500
- SW-3000/RW
- SW-3000/QM
- Acoustic Elite (2008)
- Diamond ACS Acoustic (2008)

Basses

- Gryphon (Limited US "Guitar Center" run)
- Ultrabass, C-4XXX (2005 only)
- 004 Series

== Custom shop ==
As well as the mass-produced Diamond Series, Schecter offers a custom guitar service. On their website, Schecter says, "The Custom Shop is reserved only for orders made through a Schecter Authorized Dealer".

Example projects include:

- House of 1000 Corpses
- Tempest Tartan
- Dawn of the Dead Tribute
- CS-1 #26
- PT Nashville
- CET Flame Koa
- Hollywood Classic
