= Brian Haner =

American musician

- Also known as: Guitar Guy; Papa Gates
- Born: Brian Elwin Haner; April 7, 1958 (age 68); California, United States
- Genres: Comedy rock; rock; country; heavy metal; hard rock
- Occupations: Singer; songwriter; musician; comedian; writer; film composer
- Instruments: Guitar; piano; bass; sitar
- Years active: 1977–present
- Labels: Polydor; Indie

Brian Elwin Haner Sr. (born April 7, 1958), also known as Guitar Guy or Papa Gates, is an American musician, comedian, and author. Haner is known for touring with fellow stand-up comedian/ventriloquist Jeff Dunham, as in the 2008 Christmas program, Jeff Dunham's Very Special Christmas Special. He is also a noted session musician for Avenged Sevenfold, which his son, Brian Haner Jr. (a.k.a. Synyster Gates), is the lead guitarist.

== Early life ==
Haner got his first guitar when he was five years old, after seeing The Beatles perform on The Ed Sullivan Show. He joined his first band, The Plastic Mind, when he was ten years old.

== Career ==
A year before finishing high school, Haner got a summer job touring with Sam the Sham and the Pharaohs, best known for their hit songs "Woolly Bully" and "Li'l Red Riding Hood". After high school, Haner did session work and played in night clubs in the Los Angeles area while attending The Dick Grove School of Music, where he studied composition, Arranging, Advanced Music Theory and Film Scoring.

He spent a year as one of Motown star Norman Whitfield's main session guitar players, working with The Undisputed Truth, Rose Royce & Jr. Walker. His work with Whitfield included the songs "Car Wash" and "Wishing on a Star", as well as several movie soundtracks, including Car Wash (1976), Which Way Is Up (1977) and Animal House (1978). His recording credits include Frank Zappa, Tower of Power, The Ventures, Avenged Sevenfold.

Haner signed his first record deal with Polydor under the name of Brian West. His self-produced first album, Don't Stop Now, featuring the Tower of Power horns, was successful in Europe, where it was certified gold in several countries. Throughout the 1980s, Haner recorded and toured mainly in Europe. In the early '90s, his composition work extended to scoring television shows and films, including TV 101 and Eerie, Indiana. From 1998 to 2003, Haner produced his wife's hypnosis show as he continued as a session musician. In 2003, he signed with a Nashville music publisher and released two CDs: My Old Guitar and Carney Man. The latter's success led to a successful run in stand-up comedy.

In 2005, Haner's first novel, Carney Man, was published. After a year spent mostly in comedy clubs and in Las Vegas opening for comedians, including Bobby Slayton, Ralphie May, Lisa Lampanelli and Brett Butler, Haner started touring and doing Comedy Central television specials as "Guitar Guy" with Jeff Dunham. While on tour with Dunham, Haner released two solo CDs: Cougar Bait and Fistfight at the Wafflehouse. He also released a CD with Dunham, Don't Come Home for Christmas (2008), featuring Dunham's puppets singing Haner's original songs. Since leaving Jeff Dunham's show in 2011, he has released three more CDs: The Artist Formerly Known as Guitar Guy, Alone and Perfect World.

In 2012, he spent the summer in Africa, headlining the prestigious South Africa Comedy Festival. Haner also appeared on Showtime's "Red Light Comedy Special" with Bert Kreischer, taped in Amsterdam, and on AXS TV's "Gotham Comedy Live from NYC", performing his own music and stand-up comedy. That year, he released his second book, Ginny Reb, about a young woman's experiences in the Confederate army.

Haner took a break from comedy and performing in 2014, so he and his wife Suzy could take over as coordinators of the Orange County School of the Arts' Commercial Music program in Orange County, California. In the fall of 2016, he composed the music score for the two-hour premiere of the highly acclaimed television show Z Nation on the SyFy Channel.

Haner continues to do session work, and in 2018, he played sitar on The Ventures' first album in over 15 years. 2018 also saw the launch of the Synyster Gates School of Music, a free online school created by him and his son for guitarists of all levels.

He returned to comedy in 2018 and did a US tour with "The Deplorables". In 2019, he teamed up with comedian Michael Loftus to do a comedy special for FOX Nation.

In 2025, he wrote and starred in "A Bennington Christmas Carol". A musical based on Dickens' Christmas Carol, but set in 1926 Bennington Vermont.

=== With Avenged Sevenfold ===
Haner made his first appearance with Avenged Sevenfold on their third studio album, City of Evil (2005), playing acoustic and electric guitar on several tracks, including a dual guitar solo with his son on "Sidewinder". He contributed string arrangements to their self-titled album in 2007 and was the orchestral arranger on the track "Until the End," which would appear on the album Diamonds in the Rough (2008). He played additional guitar on the track "So Far Away" and the guitar solo on "Tonight the World Dies" on their Nightmare album in 2010. He played the outro guitar solos on both "Coming Home", from Hail to the King (2013), and "Angels", from The Stage (2016). In October 2017, Haner made a rare live appearance with Avenged Sevenfold at their all-acoustic concert at the Grammy Museum in L.A.

When with the band Haner goes by the name "Papa Gates", to go with his son going by the name Synyster Gates.

== Personal life ==
In 1980, Haner married his first wife, Jan (Smith) Gera. The couple had two sons: Brian Haner Jr., known as Synyster Gates, the aforementioned lead guitarist for metal band Avenged Sevenfold, and Brent Haner, an insurance agent at Trinity One Insurance. The couple divorced in 1990.

Haner is currently married to Suzy Haner, a comedic hypnotist. They have one daughter, McKenna, born in 1997.
