= Stevie Blacke =

American musician and producer

- Genres: Pop rock, rock
- Occupation: Musician
- Instruments: Violin, cello; mandolin; lap steel guitar; erhu; guitar; esraj; sitar; dobro
- Years active: 1994–present
- Website: stevieblacke.com

Stevie Blacke (born in London, England) is an American producer, musician, arranger, and multi-instrumentalist who is best known for having composed string arrangements on many hit records.

Born in London and raised in Ohio, Blacke grew up with the music of Eric Clapton and Pink Floyd, before he attended the Berklee College of Music to study guitar, mandolin and violin. He learned and first recorded cello during a session for a hip hop artist.

Since the 1990s, he recorded for artists such as Snoop Dogg, Dua Lipa, Aaliyah, Anna Nalick, Beck, Brooke Fraser, Backstreet Boys, Timbaland, Minnie Driver, Rihanna, Matchbox Twenty, Colbie Caillat, Weezer, Rick Springfield, the Kooks, Madonna, Pink, We Are Scientists, Staind, Ashlee Simpson, Alice in Chains and since 2010 he appeared on albums by Joe Cocker, Ellie Goulding, Avenged Sevenfold, Mindy McCready, Foreigner, Stone Sour, Seether, Garbage, Editors, Robert Ellis and Cher. In 2014, Blacke performed with Miley Cyrus and Madonna on MTV Unplugged.

Stevie has arranged, contracted and/or performed for TV awards shows (MTV Video Music Awards, American Idol, Billboard Music Awards, and others), and films with artists such as Dua Lipa, Kylie Minogue, Miley Cyrus, Katy Perry, Kesha, Shawn Mendes, Snoop Dogg, Chingy, Ludacris, Pink, Mark Ronson, and Seal to name a few. He has appeared on MTV Unplugged, The Tonight Show, Saturday Night Live, Jimmy Kimmel Live!, and in a few movies as well including Popstar and All Nighter.
