= Synyster Gates =

American guitarist (born 1981)

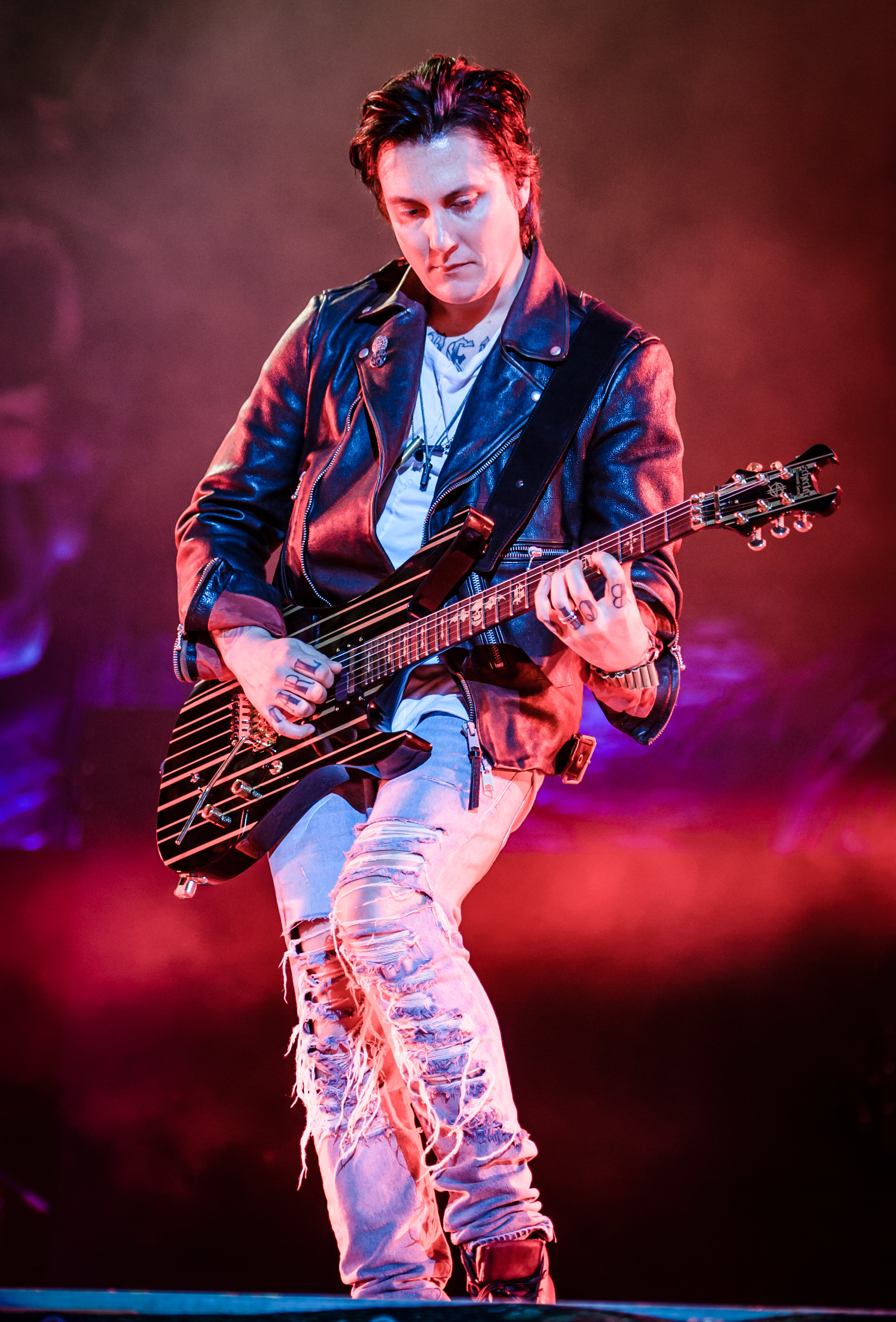
- Gates in 2018

Background information
- Also known as: Syn
- Born: Brian Elwin Haner Jr. July 7, 1981 (age 45); Long Beach, California, U.S.
- Genres: Heavy metal; progressive metal; experimental metal; metalcore (early)
- Occupations: Musician; songwriter
- Instrument: Guitar
- Years active: 1999–present
- Member of: Avenged Sevenfold
- Formerly of: Pinkly Smooth
- Website: avengedsevenfold.com
- Father: Brian Haner
- Relatives: M. Shadows (brother-in-law)

Brian Elwin Haner Jr. (born July 7, 1981), better known by his stage name Synyster Gates or simply Syn, is an American guitarist, best known as the lead guitarist of heavy metal band Avenged Sevenfold . He ranks No. 9 on Guitar World's best metal guitarists of all time. Gates was voted as Best Metal Guitarist in the World by Total Guitar in 2016.

== Early life ==
Synyster Gates is the son of musician, author, and comedian Brian Haner Sr., known as Papa Gates, who worked with Sam the Sham's band in the 1970s and has done session work for Avenged Sevenfold. Gates studied at the Musicians Institute in Los Angeles, California, as part of the Guitar Institute of Music program, studying jazz and classical guitar.

== Career ==
=== Avenged Sevenfold ===
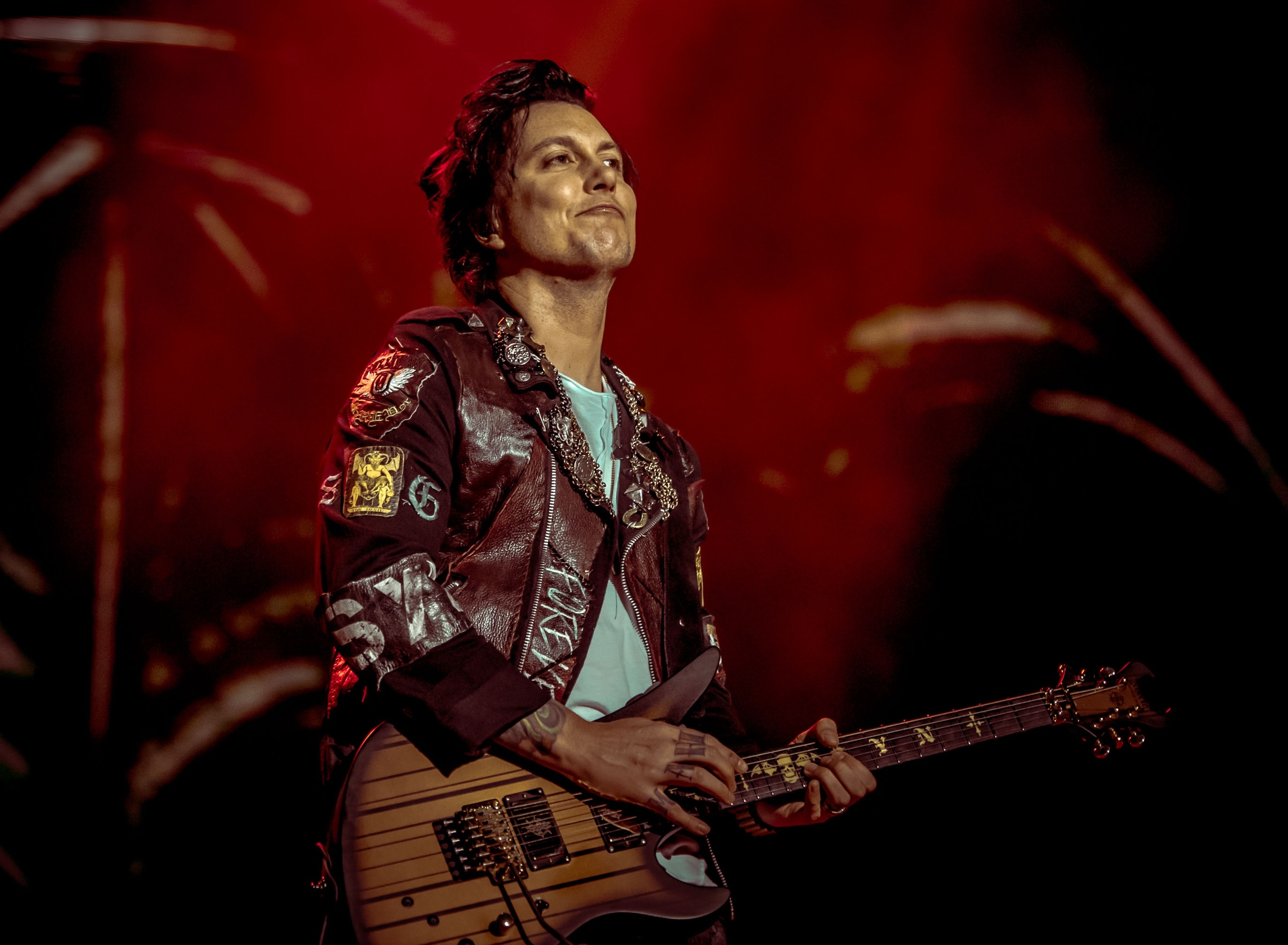
Gates performing live in 2017

Gates was featured on the EP Warmness on the Soul, which contains select songs from the first album as well as his new version of "To End the Rapture". His name on the EP was written as "Synyster Gaytes".

Gates was voted Sexiest Male in the 2008 Kerrang! Readers Poll. In 2010, Guitar World listed him as one of the 30 greatest shredders of all time. They described him as being able to perform finger-twisting licks, acrobatic sweeps, devilish chromatics and towering dual-harmonies. Gates was chosen as one of Guitar Hero's 50 fastest guitarists. On Guitar World's 2010 Readers Poll, Gates was chosen Snappiest Dresser and the Best Metal Guitarist. Rock One Magazine's 2010 Readers Poll voted Gates the No. 3 best musician in the industry. On April 20, 2011, Gates won the Revolver Golden God award for Best Guitarist along with bandmate Zacky Vengeance. Avenged Sevenfold picked up numerous other awards and delivered the headlining performance of the night.

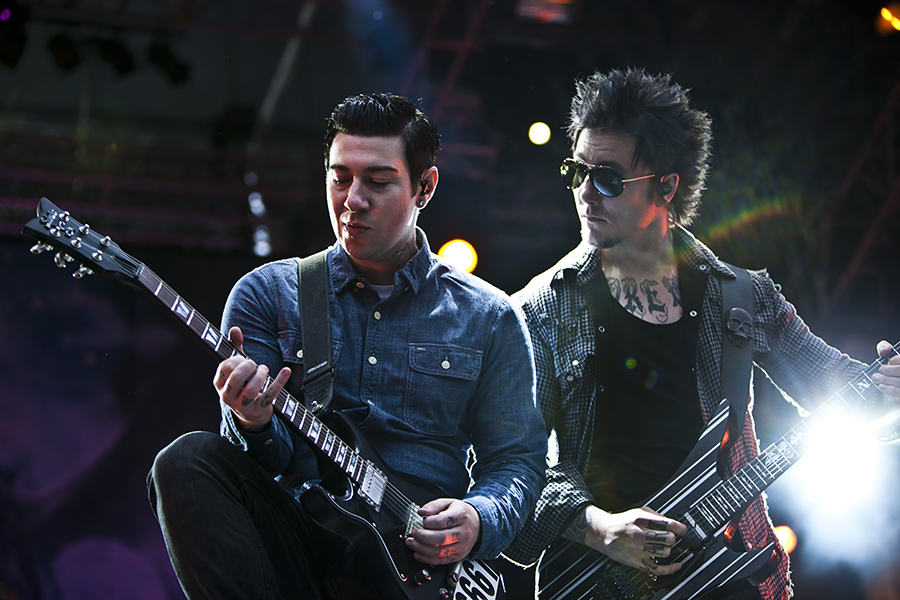
Zacky Vengeance (left) and Gates performing in 2011

In the special edition of Revolver magazine that was released the same day as the Nightmare album, Gates stated that he originally started out writing the song "So Far Away" in honor of his grandfather. However, the song is now primarily about his former bandmate, best friend and previous drummer of Avenged Sevenfold, the Rev, who died on December 28, 2009.

=== Pinkly Smooth ===
Gates and the Rev played in an experimental metal band named Pinkly Smooth. Formed in the summer of 2001 in Huntington Beach, California, the band featured ex-Ballistico members Buck Silverspur on bass and D-Rock on drums. The band released one album, Unfortunate Snort on Bucktan Records, which features a crossover sound of mostly punk, ska and progressive metal. Former Avenged Sevenfold bassist Justin Sane played keyboards and piano on the album. There was speculation that Pinkly Smooth was going to produce another record, but due to the death of the Rev, it is unlikely that they will produce any more material. However, Gates has said that he would consider remastering the tracks from Unfortunate Snort and re-releasing the album.

== Influences ==
Besides metal music, Gates is a big fan of jazz, gypsy jazz, classical, and avant garde. He cites Dimebag Darrell, Django Reinhardt, Steve Vai, John Petrucci, Slash, Marty Friedman, Zakk Wylde, Allan Holdsworth, Mr. Bungle, Frank Gambale, Oingo Boingo, and Danny Elfman as his artistic influences.

Gates has named bassist Trevor Dunn of Mr. Bungle "one of [his] favorite songwriters of all time", praising his compositions of "masterful and incredibly singable atonal brilliance throughout [1995 album Disco Volante]", and concluded: "[Dunn] is nothing short of pure genius."

Gates himself has influenced Thai singer/guitarist Nene Royal, who named Gates as the guitarist she would choose if she could spend an hour learning from any guitarist. She expressed interest in how Gates "uses harmonics and creates the darker sounds" that let him "make things sound creepy". A7X later invited Royal to open their Singapore 2026 show, and to perform alongside A7X in two of A7X's own songs.

== Personal life ==
Gates married Michelle DiBenedetto in May 2010. The couple has two children, a son born in 2017 and a daughter born in 2019.

Michelle's twin sister, Valary, is married to M. Shadows. This makes him and M. Shadows brothers-in-law in addition to band-mates. They live close to one another and see each other very often.

Gates says that he taught his father how to sweep pick.

== Discography ==
=== With Avenged Sevenfold ===
- Sounding the Seventh Trumpet (2001) (only on the re-release version of "To End the Rapture")
- Waking the Fallen (2003)
- City of Evil (2005)
- Avenged Sevenfold (2007)
- Nightmare (2010)
- Hail to the King (2013)
- The Stage (2016)
- Life Is But a Dream... (2023)

=== With Pinkly Smooth ===
- Unfortunate Snort (2001)

=== Featured guest appearances ===
- Bleeding Through's "Savior, Saint, Salvation," track (with M. Shadows).
- Good Charlotte's "The River" track and music video (with M. Shadows).
- Burn Halo's "Dirty Little Girl" track and music video.
- Burn Halo's "Anejo" track.
- Brian Haner's "Blow-Up Doll" music video.
- The Jeff Dunham Show intro song (with his father).
- AxeWound's "Vultures" from their debut album of the same name.
- Machine Gun Kelly's "Save Me" from the album Lace Up (with M. Shadows).
- Linkin Park's "Faint" live at Chester Bennington's memorial concert (with M. Shadows).

== Guitars ==
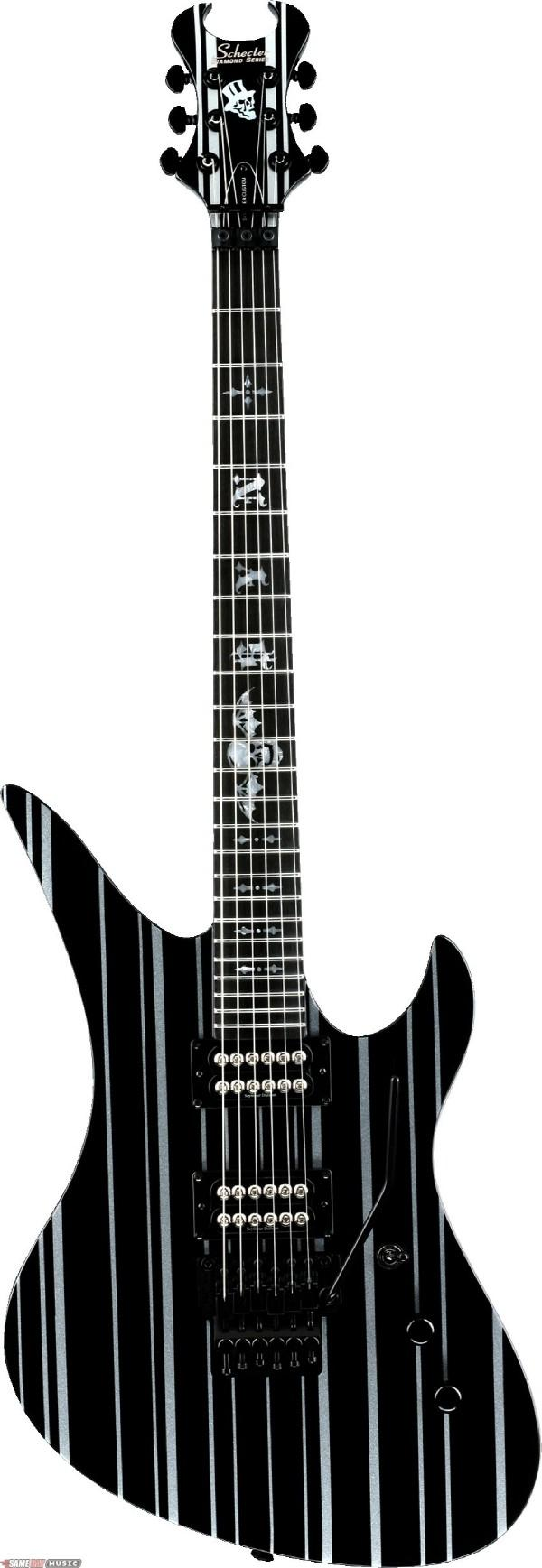
Schecter Synyster custom

Endorsed by Schecter Guitar Research since 2005, Gates is known for his many Avenger-based signature models. He has also used Gibson Guitars during the Waking the Fallen and City of Evil years. All of his signature models are solid mahogany bodies with neck-thru construction. Ebony fingerboards with custom Gothic Cross, "SYN", and Deathbat Mother of Pearl inlays. 25.5" scale length with 24 extra jumbo frets. He has been seen playing headless guitars during live performances.
