= Comedian =

Person who seeks to entertain an audience, primarily by making them laugh

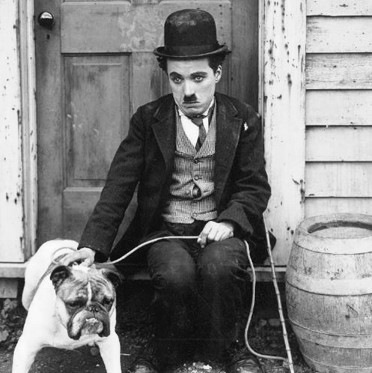
- Charlie Chaplin in The Champion (1915).

Occupation
- Names: Comedian; comic; clown
- Occupation type: Performing art
- Activity sectors: Theatre; sound recording; film; radio; television

Description
- Competencies: Acting; dance (optional); magic (optional); singing (optional); ventriloquism (optional)
- Related jobs: Humorist

A comedian or comic is a person who entertains an audience by making them laugh through jokes, humorous situations, or comic performances, often including distinctive styles of humour such as puns, irony, observation, self-deprecation, parody, and absurdism.

They perform live and through media including film, television, radio, audio recordings, and the Internet, with stand-up comedy as a major form of comic performance.

Comedians have existed since antiquity, with Aristophanes among the earliest known comic playwrights, while modern comedy developed from traditions including American minstrel shows, vaudeville, and British music hall.

== History ==
=== Ancient Greeks ===
Comedians can be dated back to 425 BC, when Aristophanes, a comic author, and playwright, wrote ancient comedic plays. He wrote 40 comedies, 11 of which survive and are still being performed. Aristophanes' comedy style took the form of satyr plays.

=== Shakespearean comedy ===
The English poet and playwright William Shakespeare wrote many comedies. A Shakespearean comedy is one that has a happy ending, usually involving marriages between the unmarried characters, and a tone and style that is more light-hearted than Shakespeare's other plays.

=== Modern era ===
American performance comedy has its roots in the 1840s from the three-act, variety show format of minstrel shows (via blackface performances of the Jim Crow character); Frederick Douglass criticized these shows for profiting from and perpetuating racism. Minstrelsy monologists performed second-act, stump-speech monologues from within minstrel shows until 1896. American standup also emerged in vaudeville theatre from the 1880s to the 1930s, with such comics as W. C. Fields, Buster Keaton and the Marx Brothers.

British performance comedy has its roots in 1850 music hall theatres, where Charlie Chaplin, Stan Laurel, and Dan Leno first performed, mentored by comedian and theatre impresario Fred Karno, who developed a form of sketch comedy without dialogue in the 1890s and also pioneered slapstick comedy.

== Media ==
In the modern era, as technology produced forms of mass communications media, these were adapted to entertainment and comedians adapted to the new media, sometimes switching to new forms as they were introduced.

=== Stand-up ===
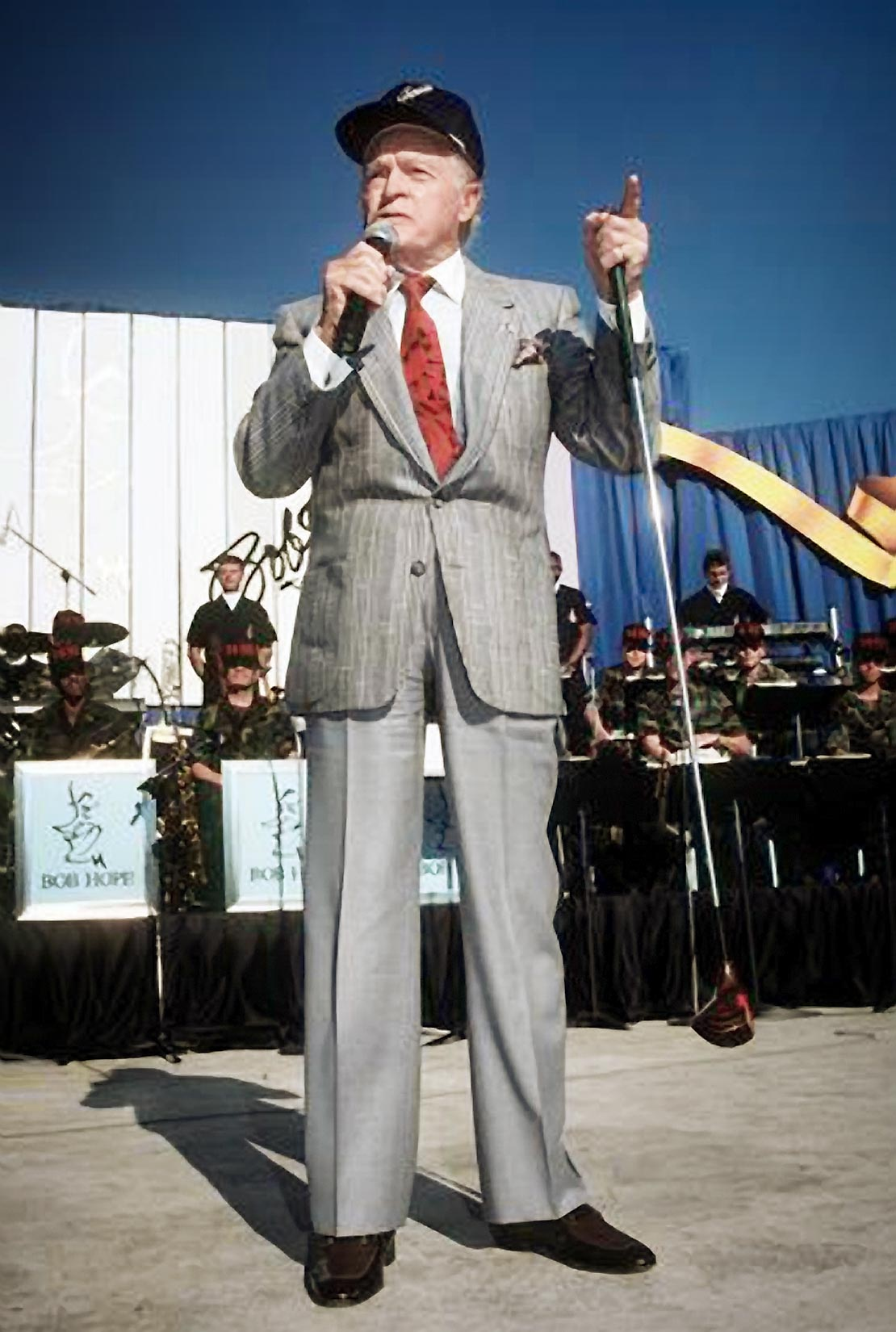
Bob Hope performing at Lackland Air Force Base in 1990

Stand-up comedy is a comic monologue performed standing on a stage. Bob Hope became the most popular stand-up comedian of the 20th century in a nearly 80-year career that included numerous comedy film roles over a five-decade span in radio, television, and entertaining armed-service troops through the USO. Other noted stand-up comedians include Lenny Bruce, Billy Connolly, George Carlin, Richard Pryor, Victoria Wood, Joan Rivers, Whoopi Goldberg and Jo Brand.

=== Audio recording ===
Some of the earliest commercial sound recordings were made by standup comedians such as Cal Stewart, who recorded collections of his humorous monologues on Edison Records as early as 1898, and other labels until his death in 1919.

Bandleader Spike Jones recorded 15 musical comedy albums satirizing popular and classical music from 1950 to his death in 1965. Tom Lehrer wrote and recorded five albums of songs satirizing political and social issues from 1953 to 1965. Musician Peter Schickele, inspired by Jones, parodied classical music with 17 albums of his music which he presented as written by "P.D.Q. Bach" (fictional son of Johann Sebastian Bach) from 1965 through 2007.

In 1968, radio surreal comedy group The Firesign Theatre revolutionized the concept of the spoken comedy album by writing and recording elaborate radio plays employing sound effects and multitrack recording, which comedian Robin Williams called "the audio equivalent of a Hieronymous Bosch painting." Comedy duo Cheech and Chong recorded comedy albums in a similar format from 1971 through 1985.

=== Film ===
Karno took Chaplin and Laurel on two trips to the United States to tour the vaudeville circuit. On the second one, they were recruited by the fledgling silent film industry. Chaplin became the most popular screen comedian of the first half of the 20th century. Chaplin and Stan Laurel were protégés of Fred Karno, the English theatre impresario of British music hall, and in his biography Laurel stated, "Fred Karno didn't teach Charlie [Chaplin] and me all we know about comedy. He just taught us most of it". Chaplin wrote films such as Modern Times and The Kid. His films still have a major impact on comedy in films today.

Laurel met Oliver Hardy in the US and teamed up as Laurel and Hardy. Keaton also started making silent comedies.

Fields appeared in Broadway musical comedies, three silent films in 1915 and 1925, and in sound films starting in 1926. The Marx brothers also made the transition to film in 1929, by way of two Broadway musicals.

Many other comedians made sound films, such as Bob Hope (both alone, and in a series of "Road to ..." comedies with partner Bing Crosby), ventriloquist Edgar Bergen, and Jerry Lewis (both with and without partner Dean Martin).

Some comedians who entered film expanded their acting skills to become dramatic actors, or started as actors specializing in comic roles, such as Dick Van Dyke, Paul Lynde, Michael Keaton, Bill Murray and Denis Leary.

=== Radio ===
Radio comedy began in the United States when Raymond Knight launched The Cuckoo Hour on NBC in 1930, along with the 1931 network debut of Stoopnagle and Budd on CBS. Most of the Hollywood comedians who did not become dramatic actors (e.g. Bergen, Fields, Groucho and Chico Marx, Red Skelton, Jack Benny, Fred Allen, Judy Canova, Hope, Martin and Lewis), transitioned to United States radio in the 1930s and 1940s. These programs had a ready supply of Hollywood comedians to draw from, including the cream of British music hall talent.

Restrained by the conservative values of the nation's only broadcaster (BBC), radio comedy did not develop in the United Kingdom until a generation later, when wartime morale demanded a greater emphasis on light entertainment. Popular shows included Danger – Men at Work!, ITMA, and Much-Binding-in-the-Marsh. These led to the post-war development of such hits as The Goon Show and Hancock's Half Hour. Radio became a proving-ground for many later United Kingdom comedians. Chris Morris began his career in 1986 at Radio Cambridgeshire, and Ricky Gervais began his comedy career in 1997 at London radio station XFM. The League of Gentlemen, Mitchell and Webb and The Mighty Boosh all transferred to television after broadcasting on BBC Radio 4.

=== Television ===
On television there are comedy talk shows where comedians make fun of current news or popular topics. Such comedians include Jay Leno, Conan O'Brien, Graham Norton, Jim Jefferies, James Corden, John Oliver, Jonathan Ross, David Letterman, and Chelsea Handler. There are sketch comedies, such as Mr. Show with Bob and David and Monty Python who created their sketch comedy show Monty Python's Flying Circus (a BBC show that influenced Saturday Night Live), and sitcoms, such as Roseanne, Only Fools and Horses, and Not Going Out, as well as popular panel shows like The Big Fat Quiz of the Year, Have I Got News for You, and Celebrity Juice. The most acclaimed sitcoms include Seinfeld and Cheers.

=== Internet ===
Comedy is increasingly enjoyed online. Several comedians got their start through the internet such as Bo Burnham . Comedians streaming videos of their stand-up include Bridget Christie, Louis C.K. and Daniel Kitson.

== Jokes ==
There are many established formats for jokes. One example is the pun or double-entendre, where similar words are interchanged. The Two Ronnies often used puns and double-entendre. Stewart Francis and Tim Vine are examples of current comedians who deploy numerous puns. Jokes based on puns tend to be very quick and easy to digest, which sometimes leads to other joke forms being overlooked, for example in the Funniest Joke of the Fringe awards. Other jokes may rely on confounding an audience's expectations through a misleading setup (known as a 'pull back and reveal' in the UK and a 'leadaway' in the US). Ed Byrne is an example of a comedian who has used this technique. Some jokes are based on ad absurdum extrapolations, for example much of Richard Herring and Ross Noble's standup. In ironic humour there is an intentional mismatch between a message and the form in which it is conveyed (for example the work of Danielle Ward). Other joke forms include observation (Michael McIntyre), whimsy (David O'Doherty), self-deprecation (Robin Williams) and parody (Diane Morgan).

== Personality traits ==
In a January 2014 study, conducted in the British Journal of Psychiatry, scientists found that comedians tend to have high levels of psychotic personality traits. In the study, researchers analyzed 404 male and 119 female comedians from Australia, Britain, and the United States. The participants were asked to complete an online questionnaire designed to measure psychotic traits in healthy people. They found that comedians scored "significantly higher on four types of psychotic characteristics compared to a control group of people who had non-creative jobs." Gordon Claridge, a professor of experimental psychology at the University of Oxford and leader of the study claimed, "the creative elements needed to produce humor are strikingly similar to those characterizing the cognitive style of people with psychosis—both schizophrenia and bipolar disorder." However, labeling comedians' personality traits as "psychotic" does not mean that individual is a psychopath, since psychopathy is distinct from psychosis, and neither does it mean their behavior is necessarily pathological.

== Highest-paid comedians ==
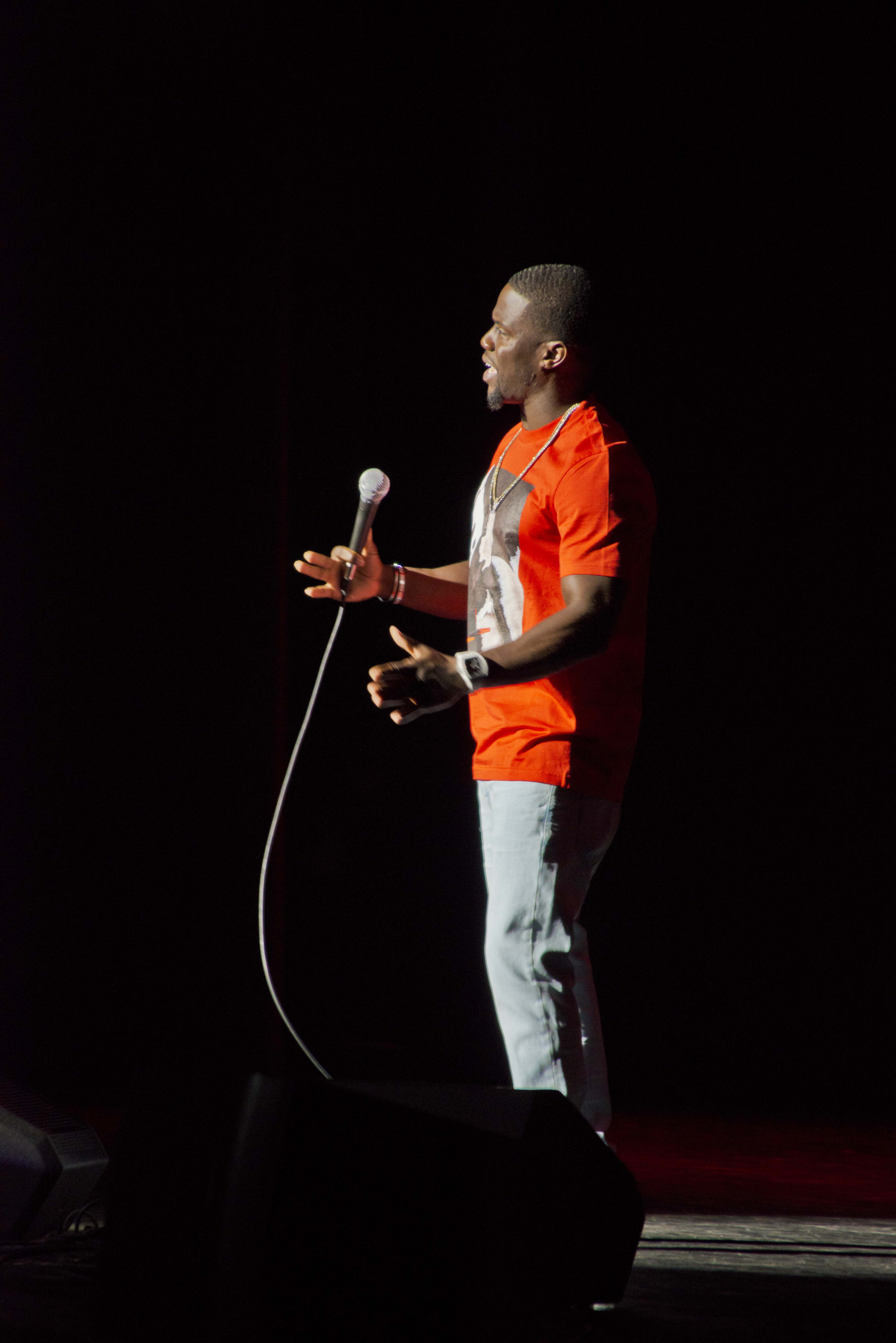
Kevin Hart performing at MSC Town Hall in 2014

Forbes publishes an annual list of the most financially successful comedians in the world, similarly to their Celebrity 100 list. Their data sources include Nielsen Media Research, Pollstar, Box Office Mojo and IMDb. The list was topped by Jerry Seinfeld from 2006 until 2015, who lost the title to Kevin Hart in 2016. In that year, the eight highest paid comedians were from the United States, including Amy Schumer, who became the first woman to be listed in the top ten. The top ten of 2016 are as follows: (Note: The Forbes 2016 list appears to exclude people often regarded as comedians who are better known for other professions, despite having earned more than some in the list's top ten, including actors Adam Sandler and Melissa McCarthy, and late-night talk show hosts Stephen Colbert and Jimmy Fallon.)

Rank	Name	Annual earnings (USD)	Nationality	Age	Notable works
1	Kevin Hart	$87.5 million	United States	38	Kevin Hart: Let Me Explain, Ride Along, The Secret Life of Pets
2	Jerry Seinfeld	$43.5 million	United States	63	Seinfeld, The Marriage Ref, I'm Telling You for the Last Time
3	Terry Fator	$21 million	United States	52	America's Got Talent
4	Amy Schumer	$17 million	United States	36	Trainwreck, Inside Amy Schumer, 2015 MTV Movie Awards
5	Jeff Dunham	$13.5 million	United States	55	Spark of Insanity, Arguing with Myself, Jeff Dunham's Very Special Christmas Special
6	Dave Chappelle	$13 million	United States	44	Dave Chappelle's Block Party, Half Baked, Chappelle's Show
7	Jim Gaffigan	$12.5 million	United States	51	Jim Gaffigan: Mr. Universe, The Jim Gaffigan Show, It's Kind of a Funny Story
8	Gabriel Iglesias	$9.5 million	United States	41	Hot and Fluffy, The Fluffy Movie, Gabriel Iglesias Presents Stand Up Revolution
9	Russell Peters	$9 million	Canada	47	Red, White and Brown, Outsourced, Breakaway
10	John Bishop	$7 million	United Kingdom	51	John Bishop's Britain, The John Bishop Show, Panto!

== See also ==
- Comedy genres
- Humor
- Impressionist
- List of comedians
- List of humorists
- List of musical comedians
- Satire
