= Dunkeld (disambiguation) =

Dunkeld is a town in Perth and Kinross, Scotland.

Dunkeld may also refer to:

- Dunkeld, Gauteng, a suburb of Johannesburg, South Africa
- Dunkeld, Ontario, a community of Brockton, Ontario, Canada
- Dunkeld, Queensland, a locality in the Maranoa Region, Queensland, Australia
- Dunkeld, Victoria, a town in Victoria, Australia
- House of Dunkeld, a royal house of Scotland

== See also ==
- Dunkeld West
