= Hugh Wyndham Park =

Public park in Dunkeld West, Johannesburg, South Africa

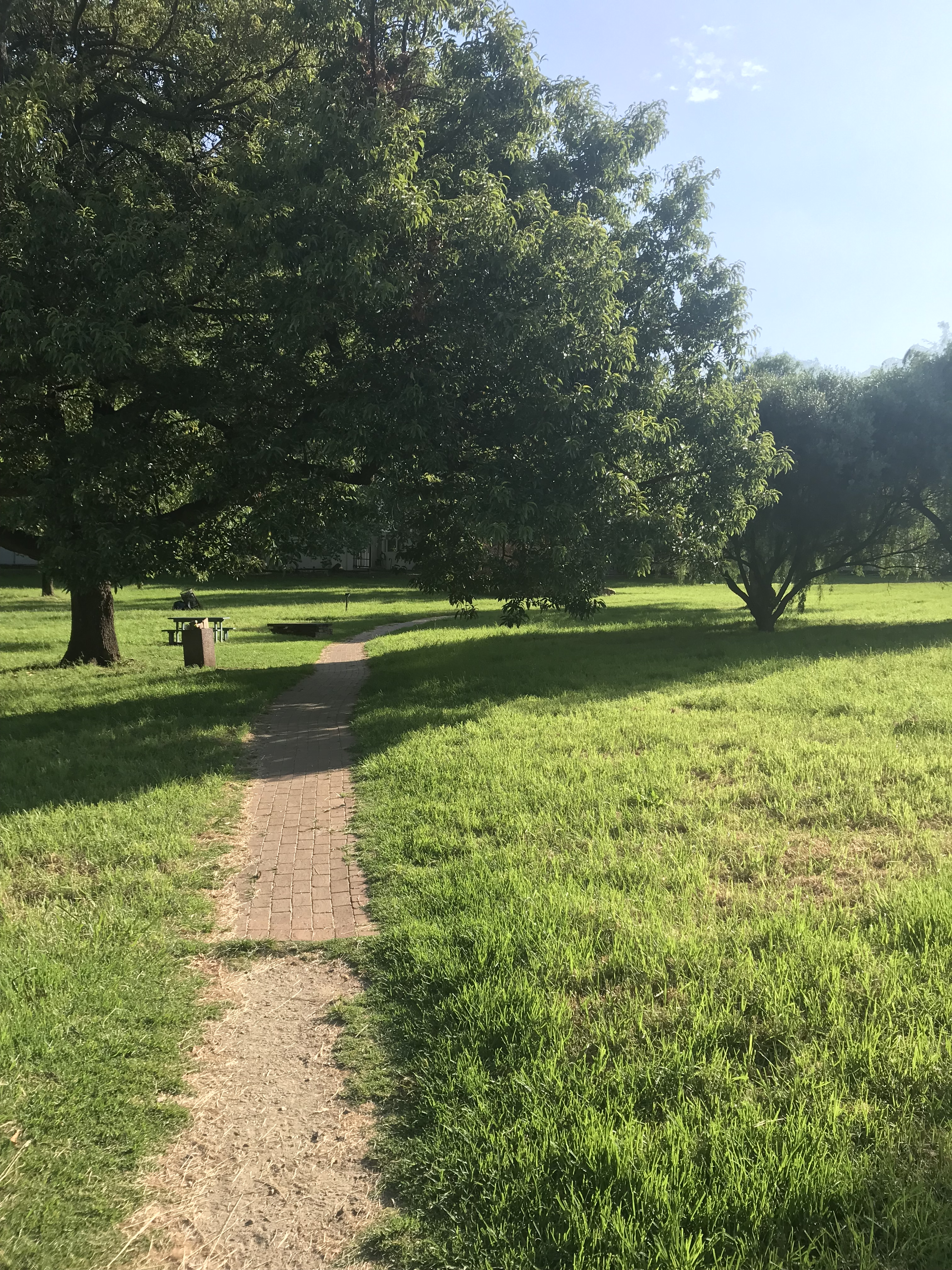
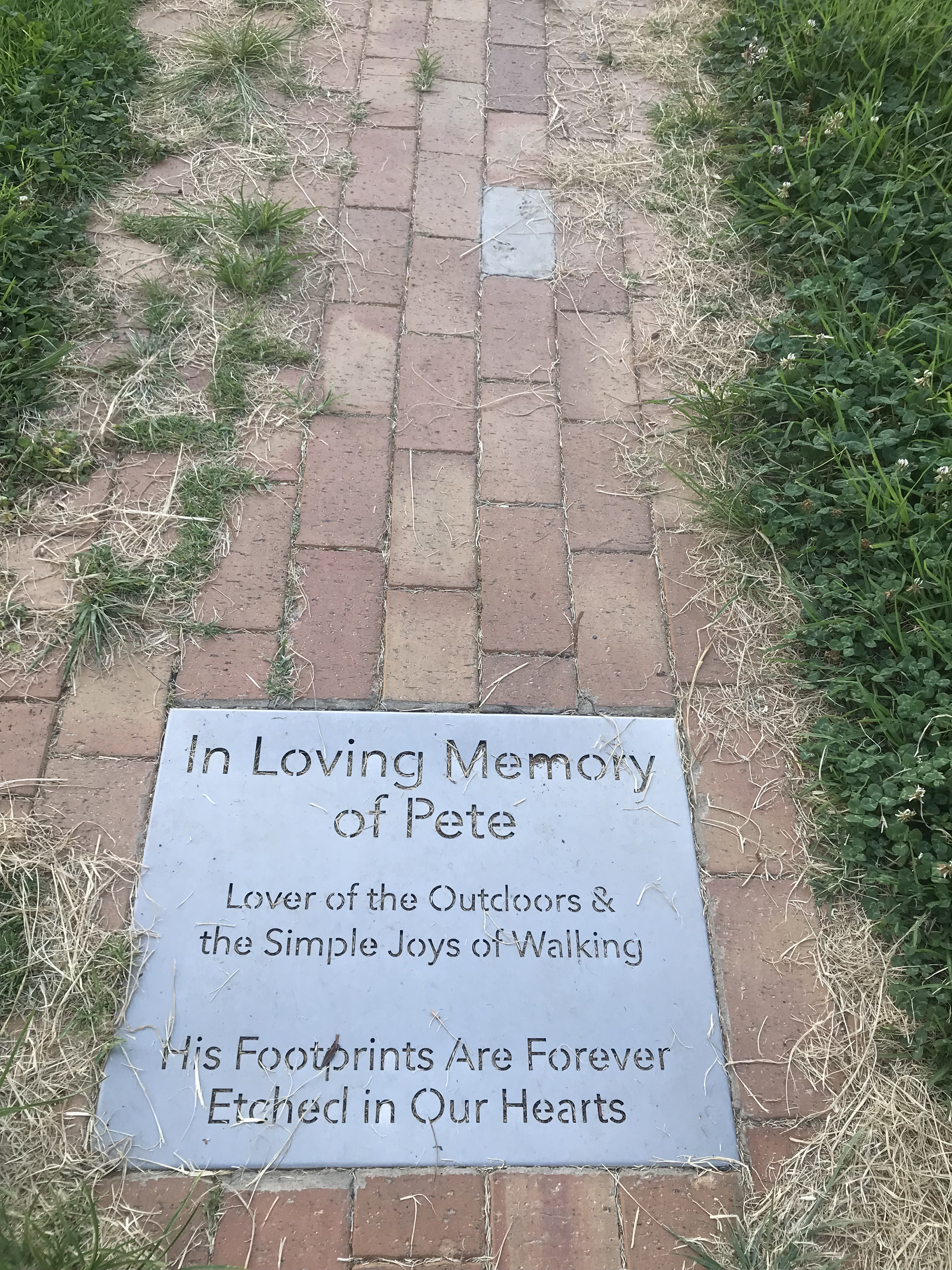
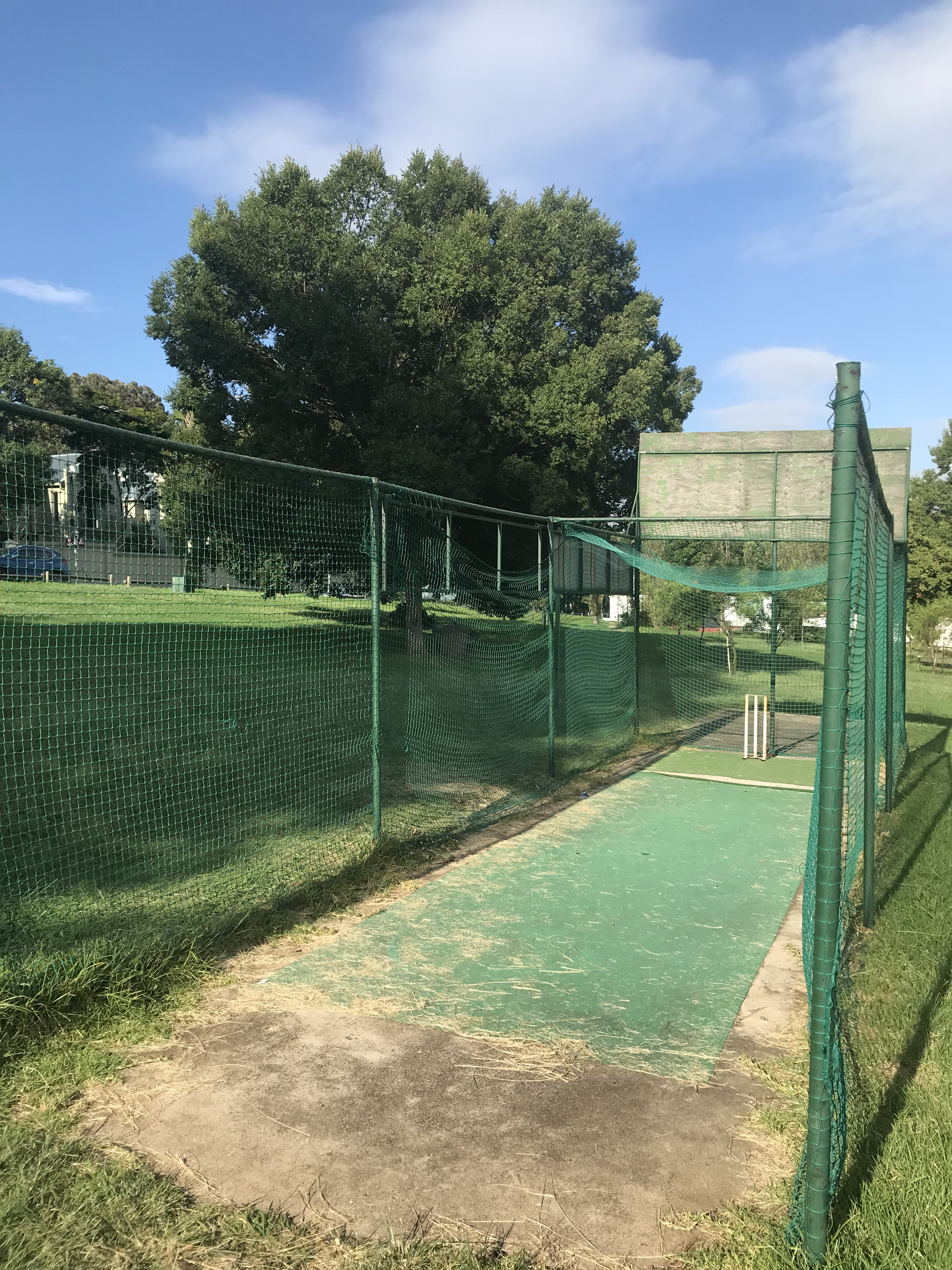
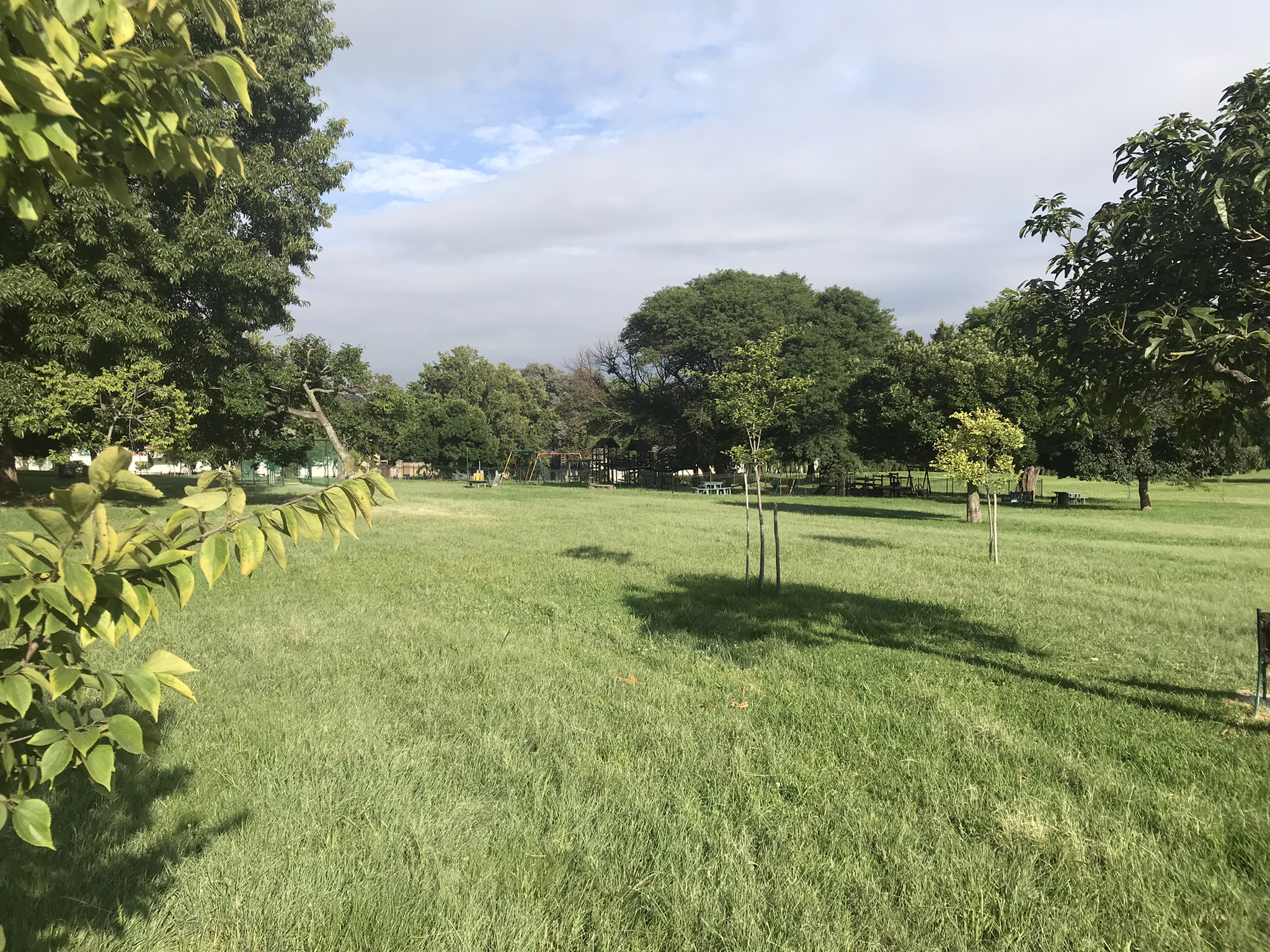
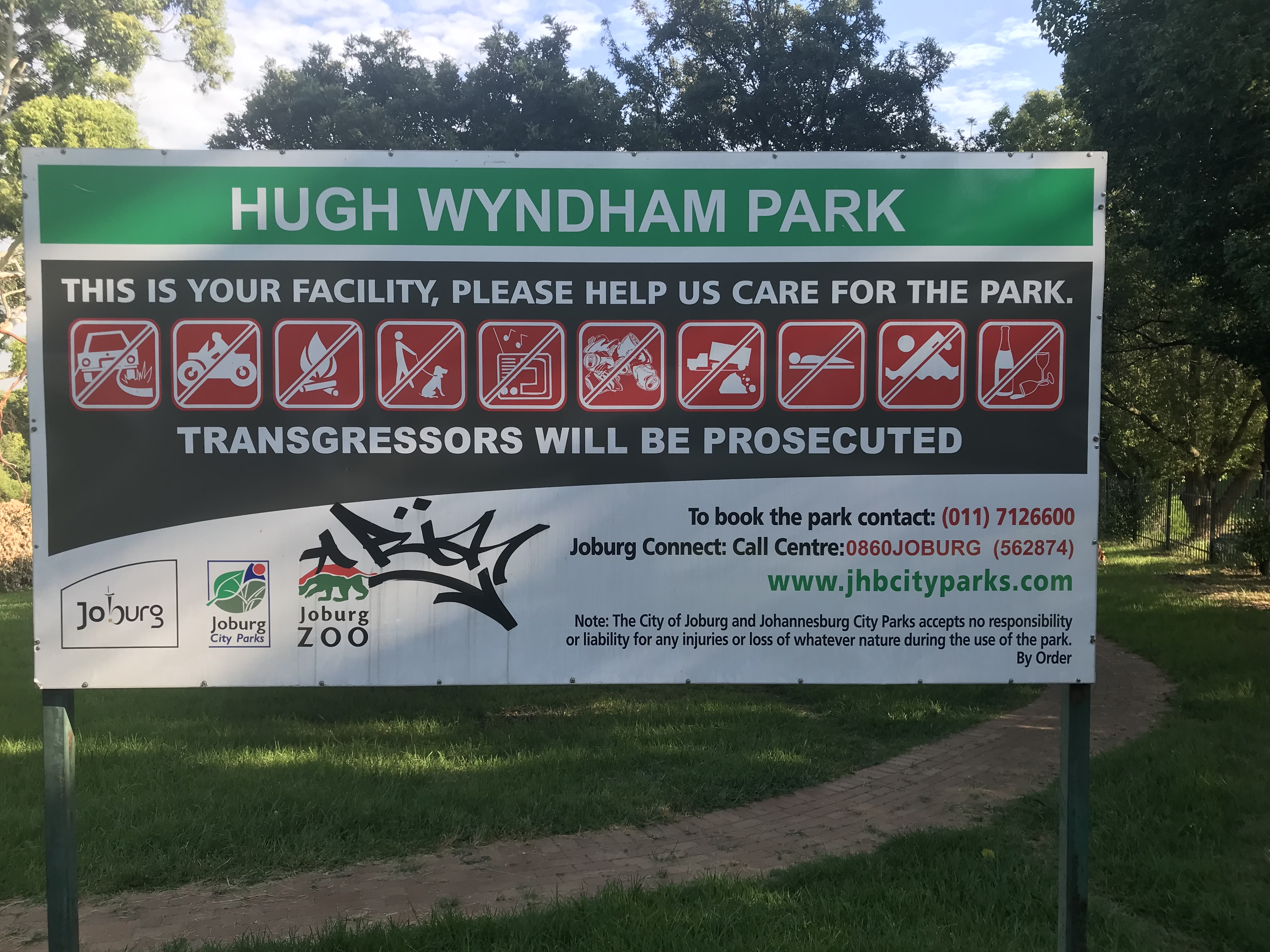

Hugh Wyndham Park is a public suburban park located in the northern suburb of Dunkeld West, Johannesburg, in Gauteng, South Africa. The park serves both as a recreational green space for the surrounding residential community and a place of cultural glue, where business and families and society intersect with their networks. The park features walking paths, sports facilities, and a children's playground. It is notable for strong local community involvement in its maintenance and development.

== Location ==
Hugh Wyndham Park is situated on Hume Road in Dunkeld West, a leafy residential suburb near the business districts of Rosebank and Sandton. The park is easily accessible to local residents and forms part of Johannesburg's network of public open spaces.

== Features ==
The park includes a variety of recreational and leisure facilities, including:

- A fenced children's playground
- Cricket practice nets
- Walking and jogging paths
- Open grassy areas suitable for picnics and informal recreation
- Dog-friendly open spaces

The park is generally maintained through a combination of municipal services and volunteer efforts by local residents.

== Community involvement ==
Hugh Wyndham Park is supported by an active community group known as the Friends of Hugh Wyndham Park, operating in association with the Craigpark Residents’ Association. The group has played a key role in fundraising, organising clean-up initiatives, and overseeing improvements to park infrastructure.

Community-led projects have included upgrades to playground equipment, fencing, and general landscaping. Proposals for further improvements have included educational signage, ecological enhancements, and additional recreational amenities, subject to funding and municipal approval.

== Events ==
The park has hosted various community events, including seasonal picnics, outdoor arts activities, and family-oriented gatherings. It is also used for volunteer clean-up campaigns aligned with broader municipal initiatives such as A Re Sebetseng, a Johannesburg civic engagement programme.

== Challenges and future plans ==
Like many urban parks in Johannesburg, Hugh Wyndham Park faces challenges related to funding, safety, and long-term sustainability. Future development plans depend largely on continued community support and collaboration with local government authorities.

== See also ==
- List of parks in Johannesburg
- Dunkeld West
