= Advertising Regulatory Board =

South African advertising regulator

- Predecessor: Advertising Standards Authority of South Africa
- Formation: November 2018; 8 years ago
- Registration no.: NPC 2018/5288775/08
- Legal status: Non-profit organisation
- Purpose: Advertising regulator
- Headquarters: Albury Office Park, 1 Magalieszicht Road, Dunkeld West
- Location: Johannesburg, South Africa
- Coordinates: 26.1260407°S 28.0317545°E
- Members: Members: Association for Communication and Advertising (ACA); Interactive Advertising Bureau (IAB); Marketing Association of South Africa (MASA); Association of Independent Publishers (AIP); Drinks Federation of South Africa (DFSA); National Association of Broadcasters (DAB); Pet Food Industry Association of Southern Africa (PFISA); Vapour Products Association of South Africa (VPASA); (2023)
- CEO: Gail Schimmel
- Website: arb.org.za

The Advertising Regulatory Board (ARB) is an independent entity organised and financed by members of the marketing communications industry of South Africa. Its purpose is to manage South Africa's voluntary, self-regulating system of advertising.

== History ==
In 2018, the ARB was founded after the forced liquidation of the Advertising Standards Authority of South Africa (ASA). It superseded the ASA in terms of the Electronic Communications Act in administering the Code of Advertising Practice.

In 2021, the ARB signed a memorandum of understanding with the Independent Communications Authority of South Africa to escalate broadcast licensee issues related to advertising.

== Jurisdiction ==
In September 2017, the Supreme Court of Appeal ruled in Herbex (Pty) Ltd v The Advertising Standards Authority that the ASA only had the power to issue an instruction over members.

In a 2022 judgement, the Supreme Court of Appeal affirmed in Bliss Brands (Pty) Ltd v Advertising Regulatory Board NPC and Others that the ARB has the authority to issue an instruction (for the benefit of its members) over any advertisement (including non-members' advertisements).

In terms of Section 55 of the Electronic Communications Act, the ARB has the power to rule against broadcasters.

== Member organisations ==
The founding members are:

- Association for Communication and Advertising
- Interactive Advertising Bureau South Africa
- Marketing Association of South Africa

=== Members ===
- Association of Independent Publishers
- Drinks Federation of South Africa
- National Association of Broadcasters
- Pet Food Industry Association of Southern Africa
- Vapour Products Association of South Africa
- Cosmetics Toiletry & Fragrance Association of South Africa
- South African Insurance Association
