= Jeff Dunham: Controlled Chaos =

- Genre: Comedy
- Written by: Jeff Dunham
- Directed by: Michael Simon; Matthew McNeil (segment director)
- Starring: Jeff Dunham
- Country of origin: United States
- Original language: English

Production
- Executive producers: Judi Brown-Marmel; Jeff Dunham; Robert Hartmann; Steve Kroopnick; Stu Schreiberg
- Production locations: Richmond, Virginia, United States
- Cinematography: James Markham Hall Jr. (listed as Jamie Hall)
- Editor: Matthew McNeil
- Camera setup: Multi-camera
- Running time: 97 mins
- Production company: Levity Productions

Original release
- Network: Comedy Central
- Release: September 25, 2011

Related
- Jeff Dunham's Very Special Christmas Special; Jeff Dunham: Minding the Monsters

Controlled Chaos is a stage performance of comedian and ventriloquist Jeff Dunham. The show was taped in Landmark Theater, Richmond, Virginia, USA on June 3 and 4, 2011. The DVD was released on 25 September 2011 within the United States and 7 November 2011 in the United Kingdom. Controlled Chaos was one of the top 5 most-viewed programs on Comedy Central, premiering in front of an estimated 8.3 million viewers.

The Telegraph rated the DVD release 2/5 stars, calling Dunham's ventriloquist skills "impressive" but found some of his jokes neither appropriate nor funny. They also noted that, while the start of the show is relatively family-friendly, with Dunham discussing his childhood, the more show progresses the less family friendly it becomes.

== Characters ==
- Walter - A grumpy old Vietnam War veteran with an attitude who frequently complains about his wife.
- Achmed the Dead Terrorist - The skeletal corpse of an incompetent suicide bomber, whom Dunham uses to satirize the contemporary issue of terrorism.
- Achmed Jr - The estranged son of Achmed. Controlled Chaos was his first onscreen appearance.
- Peanut - A purple woozle from Micronesia described by Walter as "a frickin' Muppet on crack." He wears one red Converse shoe on his left foot. In the first and second specials, he mocks José's accent, and his status on a stick, saying, "Maybe it was a horrible pogo accident. You know, doing-doing.... crriccck! Olé!"
- José Jalapeño on a Stick - a jalapeño pepper on a stick, or "steek" as he says it with a Hispanic accent.
- Little Jeff - A miniature east coast version of Jeff himself. He appeared in Jeff Dunham: Controlled Chaos as a puppet that Peanut used when trying to do ventriloquism like Jeff.
- Bubba J - In Jeff's own words, "Pretty much just white-trash trailer-park." He talks about NASCAR and his love of beer. Though not actually featured in Dunham's live stage performance, Bubba J appears as the security guard stationed in the theater's vestibule to watch for Achmed's arrival; he attempts to park Achmed's hot-rod roadster, but in his greatly-inebriated state, only succeeds in blowing the car sky-high.

== Certifications and sales ==
Region	Certification	Certified units/sales
United States (RIAA) DVD	5× Platinum	500,000^{^}
^{^} Shipments figures based on certification alone.
