= Woozle (disambiguation) =

A woozle is a fictional creature in the Winnie-the-Pooh stories.

Woozle may also refer to:

- Woozle, the supposed race of Jeff Dunham's puppet Peanut
- Woozle, the original name for the fraggle in Fraggle Rock
- Woozle, a manifestation of the Woozle effect or evidence by citation

== See also ==
- Ouzel (disambiguation)
