= Advertising Standards Authority (South Africa) =

Consumer organisation in South Africa

Advertising Standards Authority of South Africa (ASA)
- Abbreviation: ASA
- Successor: Advertising Regulatory Board
- Formation: 1968
- Defunct: 2018
- Legal status: Non-profit organisation
- Purpose: Manage South Africa's voluntary, self-regulating system of advertising
- Location: South Africa
- Region served: South Africa
- Members: Association for Communication and Advertising; Association of Collective Investments (ACI); Cinemark (Pty) Ltd; Cosmetic Toiletry & Fragrance Association of South Africa; Furniture Traders' Association of South Africa; Health Products Association of Southern Africa; Hospital Association of South Africa; Industry Association for Responsible Alcohol Use; National Association of Broadcasters of South Africa; Out of Home Media; Pet Food Institute of Southern Africa, The; Pharmaceutical Manufacturers' Association of South Africa; Print Media SA; Printing Industries Federation of South Africa; Retail Motor Industry Organisation; South African Optometric Association; Timeshare Institute of Southern Africa
- Website: ASA home

The Advertising Standards Authority of South Africa (abbreviated ASA) was an independent entity organised and financed by members of the marketing communications industry of South Africa. Its purpose was to manage South Africa's voluntary, self-regulating system of advertising.

The ASA worked with a variety of marketing communication industry stakeholders to ensure that advertising content in the country met the requirements of its Code of Advertising Practice and to control advertising content in the South African public's interest. The ASA of South Africa's Code of Advertising Practice was based on the Consolidated ICC Code of Marketing and Advertising Communication Practice prepared by the International Chamber of Commerce. Member organisations, including advertisers, advertising agencies, and the media agreed upon advertising standards in the ASA code and worked to effect the swift correction or removal of any advertising that failed to meet their agreed-upon standards.

The Advertising Regulatory Board (ARB) superseded the ASA in terms of administering the Code of Advertising Practice.

== Members ==
Member organisations include:

- Association for Communication and Advertising
- Association of Collective Investments (ACI)
- Cinemark (Pty) Ltd
- Cosmetic Toiletry & Fragrance Association of South Africa
- Furniture Traders' Association of South Africa
- Health Products Association of Southern Africa
- Hospital Association of South Africa
- Industry Association for Responsible Alcohol Use
- National Association of Broadcasters of South Africa
- Out of Home Media
- Pet Food Institute of Southern Africa, The
- Pharmaceutical Manufacturers' Association of South Africa
- Print Media SA
- Printing Industries Federation of South Africa
- Retail Motor Industry Organisation
- South African Optometric Association
- Timeshare Institute of Southern Africa

== Notable rulings ==
- In 2008 ASA ruled that a television advertisement by GloMobile featuring Jeff Dunham's character Achmed the Dead Terrorist was offensive to Muslims and ordered GloMobile to withdraw the advertisement.

== History ==
In September 2018, the ASA was forced into liquidation.

In November 2018, the Advertising Regulatory Board (ARB) superseded the ASA in terms of administering the Code of Advertising Practice.
