= Jeff Dunham: Spark of Insanity =

- Genre: Comedy
- Written by: Jeff Dunham
- Directed by: Michael Simon
- Starring: Jeff Dunham
- Country of origin: United States
- Original language: English

Production
- Executive producers: Judi Brown-Marmel; Jeff Dunham; Robert Hartmann; Steve Kroopnick; Stu Schreiberg
- Producer: Steve Marmel
- Production locations: Warner Theatre, Washington, D.C., United States
- Camera setup: Multi-camera
- Running time: 80 mins
- Production company: Levity Productions

Original release
- Network: Comedy Central
- Release: September 17, 2007

Related
- Jeff Dunham: Arguing with Myself; Jeff Dunham's Very Special Christmas Special

Spark of Insanity is ventriloquist Jeff Dunham's second Comedy Central special, which premiered on September 17, 2007. It features the puppets of Walter, Peanut, and José Jalapeño on a Stick as well as two new characters: Achmed the Dead Terrorist, and a new version of Melvin the Superhero. (The old Melvin appeared in an episode of Comedy Central Presents.)

== Characters ==
- Walter - A grumpy old Vietnam war veteran with an attitude. He doesn't like his wife (who remains unnamed) and likes pointing out Dunham's faults.
- Achmed the Dead Terrorist - A wisecracking terrorist who isn't very good at his job as a "suicide bomber". He is scared of Walter, partially because he finds Walter's flatulence to be more potent than mustard gas. Jeff says about Achmed, "I don't think he accomplished anything he set out to do, but I do know he managed to blow himself up." Achmed says he was killed when he set his bomb to go off in 30 minutes, but it went off in 4 seconds. He also constantly remarks towards the audience "Silence! I kill you!".
- Melvin the Superhero Guy - A superhero with limited powers and a gigantic nose. His "abilities" include flight and X-ray vision (which doesn't work on silicone) His biggest enemy is Pinocchio. His weaknesses include cupcakes and porn, but though not at the same time, claiming he, "needs a free hand!". When asked by Dunham how far he can fly, Melvin responds, "How far can you throw me?" This special marked his second and final appearance.
- Peanut - A purple woozle resembling a small caricature of an ape. Wears one red shoe on his left foot. He is the joker of the whole group. Whenever José is around him, Peanut's jokes are mainly cutting him down.
- José Jalapeño on a Stick - A giant sombrero wearing jalapeño pepper on a stick (or "steek" as he says it with a stressed Latin accent). Peanut is mean to José, frequently mocking José's being on a stick, and his accent.

== DVD release ==
The special was released on DVD and was released on Blu-ray Disc later. Its special features include:

- "The Making of Melvin" - The video shows the making of Melvin the Superhero.
- "What's Would You Put on a Stick?" - A cameraman asks people what they would put on a stick.
- "Walter's Political Announcement" - Walter announces he's running for president and states the things he will do.

== Certifications and sales ==
DVD certifications for Jeff Dunham: Spark of Insanity
Region	Certification	Certified units/sales
Netherlands (NVPI)	Gold	40,000^{^}
United States (RIAA)	20× Platinum	2,000,000^{^}
^{^} Shipments figures based on certification alone.
