= Dunkeld, Gauteng =

Dunkeld
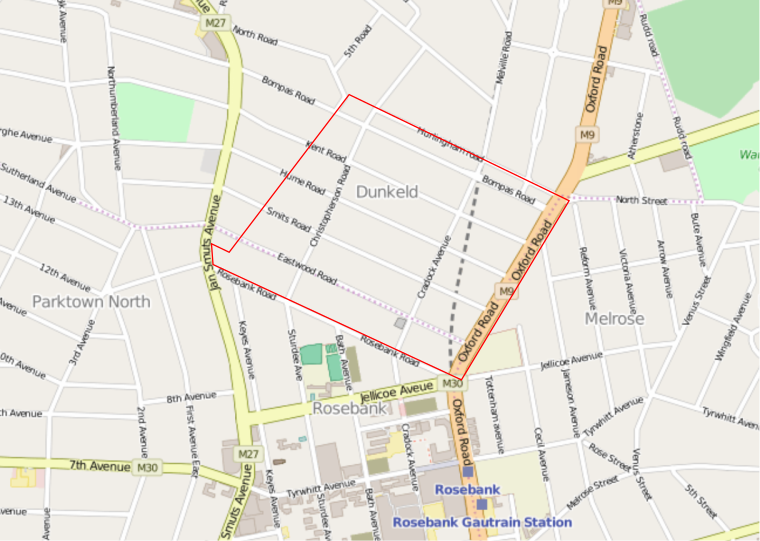

- Location within Gauteng Location within South Africa
- Coordinates: 26°8′10″S 28°2′21″E
- Country: South Africa
- Province: Gauteng
- Municipality: City of Johannesburg
- Main Place: Johannesburg

Area
  - Total: 1.38 km^{2} (0.53 sq mi)

Population (2011)
  - Total: 1,473
  - Density: 1,070/km^{2} (2,760/sq mi)

Racial makeup (2011)
  - Black African: 28.6%
  - Coloured: 1.8%
  - Indian/Asian: 2.9%
  - White: 64.4%
  - Other: 2.4%

First languages (2011)
  - English: 65.1%
  - Afrikaans: 11.3%
  - Zulu: 5.4%
  - Northern Sotho: 2.8%
  - Other: 15.4%
- Time zone: UTC+2 (SAST)
- Postal code (street): 2196

Dunkeld is a suburb of Johannesburg, South Africa. It is located in Region B of the City of Johannesburg Metropolitan Municipality. It is bordered by the suburbs of Hyde Park and Illovo to the north, Melrose to the east, Rosebank in the south and to the west, Dunkeld West.

== Origin of the name ==
The Dunkeld suburbs name has it origin in a small town in Perth and Kinross, Scotland. The township was laid out in 1904. The main street through the suburb, Bompass Street, is named after accountant and real estate pioneer Frank W.R. Bompass.
