= Ouzel =

Ouzel may refer to:

- Common blackbird or ouzel, a species of thrush, all-black in the male
- Lord Howe thrush or ouzel, an extinct subspecies of the island thrush
- River Ouzel, a river in England, a tributary of the Great Ouse

== See also ==
- Ring ouzel, a species of thrush
- White-throated dipper or water ouzel
- American dipper or water ouzel
- Ouzel Galley, an Irish merchant ship
- "Iomramh an Ousel", a poem by Séamus Ó Néill
- Woozle (disambiguation)
