= Jeff Dunham: All Over the Map =

- Genre: Comedy
- Written by: Jeff Dunham
- Directed by: Rob Dipple (listed as Robb Dipple)
- Starring: Jeff Dunham
- Theme music composer: Ted Andreadis; Johnny Griparic
- Country of origin: United States
- Original language: English

Production
- Executive producers: Judi Brown-Marmel; Jeff Dunham; Robert Hartmann; Stu Schreiberg
- Producers: John Asher; Neil A. Sheridan (listed as Neil Sheridan)
- Production locations: The O2, Dublin, Ireland; Harpa, Reykjavík, Iceland; Grieg Hall, Bergen, Norway; Wembley Arena, Wembley, London, England; LG Arena, Birmingham, England; Echo Arena, Liverpool, Merseyside, England, UK; The Clyde Theatre, Glasgow, Scotland; du Forum, Abu Dhabi, United Arab Emirates; Tel Aviv performing Arts Center, Tel Aviv, Israel; The Coca Cola Dome, Johannesburg, South Africa
- Cinematography: Rob Dipple (listed as Robb Dipple)
- Editors: Rob Dipple (listed as Robb Dipple); Jeff Dunham; Richard Florio; Dave Harrison; Ingmar Lara (lead editor)
- Camera setup: Multi-camera
- Running time: 83 mins
- Production companies: Levity Productions; Red Wire Blue Wire

Original release
- Network: Comedy Central
- Release: November 16, 2014

Related
- Jeff Dunham: Minding the Monsters l; lJeff Dunham: Unhinged in Hollywood l

All Over the Map is a stage performance by comedian and ventriloquist Jeff Dunham. The show was taped in ten countries. The DVD was released on 16 November 2014 within the United States.

== Characters ==
- Walter - A grumpy, old Vietnam War veteran with an attitude who frequently complains about his wife.
- Bubba J - In Dunham's own words, "Pretty much just white-trash trailer-park." He talks about NASCAR and his love of beer.
- Achmed the Dead Terrorist / Jacques Merde - The skeletal corpse of an incompetent suicide bomber, whom Dunham uses to satirize the contemporary issue of terrorism. Achmed the Dead Terrorist was temporarily renamed 'Jacques Merde, the Dead French Terrorist' (Jacques Merde meaning "Jack Shit") for this television special due to a formal request from Malaysia.
- Peanut - A purple woozle from Micronesia described by Walter as "a frickin' Muppet on crack." He wears one red Converse shoe on his left foot.
- José Jalapeño on a Stick.
