= Jeff Dunham's Very Special Christmas Special =

- Genre: Comedy
- Written by: Jeff Dunham
- Directed by: Michael Simon
- Starring: Jeff Dunham; Brian Haner; Zach Williams
- Composer: Brian Haner
- Country of origin: United States
- Original language: English

Production
- Executive producers: Judi Brown-Marmel; Jeff Dunham; Robert Hartmann; Steve Kroopnick; Stu Schreiberg
- Producer: Jeff Rothpan
- Production locations: Pabst Theater, Milwaukee, Wisconsin, United States
- Camera setup: Multi-camera
- Running time: 85 minutes
- Production company: Levity Productions

Original release
- Network: Comedy Central
- Release: November 16, 2008

Related
- Jeff Dunham: Spark of Insanity; The Jeff Dunham Show

Jeff Dunham's Very Special Christmas Special is the third Jeff Dunham special. It was taped at Pabst Theater in Milwaukee, Wisconsin on June 7, 2008 and premiered on Comedy Central on November 16, 2008. It was released on DVD November 18, 2008.

Dunham also released his first music album, Don't Come Home for Christmas, on November 4, 2008. It contains original Christmas songs as well as a parody of "Jingle Bells" (sung by Achmed the Dead Terrorist) entitled "Jingle Bombs". All of the songs (except "Jingle Bombs") were written and accompanied by Brian Haner, who joined Dunham's act as "Guitar Guy". Bubba J made his return in this special, singing "Roadkill Christmas".

== Characters ==
- Walter
- Achmed the Dead Terrorist
- Bubba J
- Peanut
- José Jalapeño on a Stick
- Sweet Daddy D (album only)

== DVD release ==
The special was released on DVD and Blu-ray Disc.

=== Special features ===
- Censored - This film is not found in an uncensored variety, so true Dunham fans are sorely disappointed.
- Holiday Tips - Walter, Achmed, and Peanut talk about tips for the holidays.
- Ask Santa - Audience members ask Walter (dressed as Santa) questions.
- Photo Shoot - A look at the photo shoot for the DVD cover art.
- Sleigh Ride - A look at the making of the sleigh ride sequence at the beginning.
- At the Show & the T-Shirt Bazookas - A look at the show and outtakes. Jeff and his family shoot t-shirts into the audience.
- More Jeff Dunham Stuff - An ad for jeffdunham.com

== Album ==
Jeff Dunham released his first album entitled Don't Come Home for Christmas. The album had the same theme as the special and was released around the same time. "Jingle Bombs" and "Roadkill Christmas" were the only songs in the album that were featured in the special. Sweet Daddy D (from Arguing with Myself) also appears on the album. The songs are, in order, Jeff and Walter in Milwaukee, Filling up, Pabst Theatre History (Ft. Walter), etc.

== Certifications and sales ==
Region	Certification	Certified units/sales
United States (RIAA) DVD	10× Platinum	1,000,000^{^}
^{^} Shipments figures based on certification alone.
