= Don't Come Home for Christmas =

Studio album by Jeff Dunham
- Released: November 4, 2008
- Genre: Holiday
- Label: Image Entertainment
- Producer: Brian Haner

Don't Come Home for Christmas is the first album from Jeff Dunham. It was released on November 4, 2008. Two songs were taken from the Jeff Dunham's Very Special Christmas Special, "Jingle Bombs" and "Roadkill Christmas". Both songs were remastered from the album.

== Track listing ==
- Note: All songs are written by Brian Haner with exception of those noted.

No.	Title	Writer(s)	Length
1.	"Christmas Outside the Box" (Guitar Guy) (Brian Haner)		2:59
2.	"When Santa Comes to Town" (The Whole Gang) (Jeff Dunham)		2:25
3.	"Santa is a Redneck" (Bubba J) (Jeff Dunham)		2:38
4.	"I Hate Christmas" (Walter) (Jeff Dunham)		2:11
5.	"Song for Jeff" (Peanut) (Jeff Dunham)		2:50
6.	"An American Christmas" (José) (Jeff Dunham)		3:25
7.	"Sweet Daddy Santa Claus" (Sweet Daddy Dee) (Jeff Dunham)		2:45
8.	"Jingle Bombs" (Achmed) (Jeff Dunham)	Jeff Dunham, Jeff Rothpan	2:33
9.	"Roadkill Christmas" (Bubba J) (Jeff Dunham)		2:41
10.	"Light the Fire" (Sweet Daddy Dee) (Jeff Dunham)		3:01
11.	"Christmas with the Achmed Family" (Achmed) (Jeff Dunham)		2:04
12.	"From Us to You" (The Whole Gang) (Jeff Dunham)	Brian Haner, McKenna Haner	3:36
