= Jeff Dunham: Minding the Monsters =

- Genre: Comedy
- Written by: Jeff Dunham
- Directed by: Michael Simon; Matthew McNeil (segment director, listed as Matt McNeil)
- Starring: Jeff Dunham
- Theme music composer: Ted Andreadis; Johnny Griparic
- Country of origin: United States
- Original language: English

Production
- Executive producers: Judi Brown-Marmel; Jeff Dunham; Robert Hartmann; Steve Kroopnick (listed as Stephen Kroopnick); Stu Schreiberg
- Producer: Steve Marmel
- Production locations: Savannah, Georgia, United States
- Cinematography: James Markham Hall Jr. (listed as Jamie Hall)
- Editor: Dave Harrison
- Camera setup: Multi-camera
- Running time: 80 mins
- Production companies: Levity Productions; Red Wire Blue Wire

Original release
- Network: Comedy Central
- Release: October 9, 2012

Related
- Jeff Dunham: Controlled Chaos; Jeff Dunham: All Over the Map

Minding the Monsters is a stage performance of comedian and ventriloquist Jeff Dunham. The show was taped in the Lucas Theater, Savannah, Georgia, USA on May 23 and 24, 2012. The DVD and Blu-Ray were released on October 9, 2012, within the United States.

== Certifications and sales ==
Region	Certification	Certified units/sales
United States (RIAA) DVD	4× Platinum	400,000^{^}
^{^} Shipments figures based on certification alone.

== See also ==
- Jeff Dunham
