= Jim McCawley =

Jim McCawley (May 31, 1942 – May 3, 1997) was a screenwriter and former television producer of The Tonight Show Starring Johnny Carson, for which, in 1992, he won an Emmy, in the Outstanding Variety, Music or Comedy Program (Series) category, for the penultimate episode with guests Robin Williams and Bette Midler.

McCawley began his showbiz career as a production assistant for the Broadway productions of Bye Bye Birdie and All American, and joined The Tonight Show in 1977. His other entertainment-related work included stints as a supervising producer on Vicki and as a writer and correspondent for Los Angeles all-news radio station KFWB.

McCawley started his career as a literary agent and was always on the alert for new and great talents. McCawley discovered many of today's comedians and supported the likes of David Letterman, Garry Shandling, Jerry Seinfeld, Ellen DeGeneres, Roseanne Barr, Victoria Jackson, A. Whitney Brown, Paula Poundstone, Jon Lovitz and many more who got their start on The Tonight Show thanks to him.
