= Jeff Dunham =

American ventriloquist and comedian (born 1962)

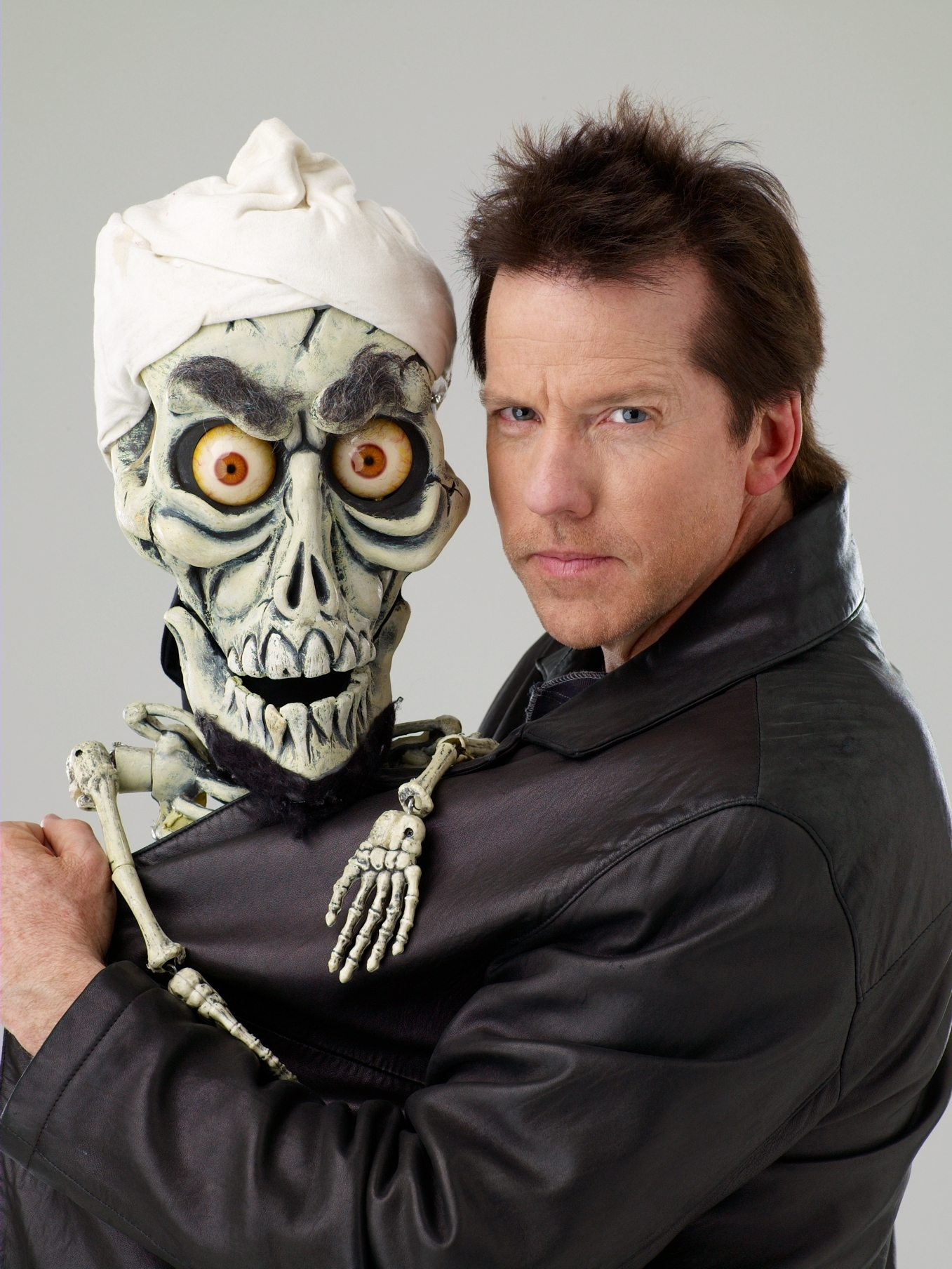
- Dunham with Achmed the Dead Terrorist, 2009
- Born: Jeffrey Douglas Dunham; April 18, 1962 (age 64); Dallas, Texas, U.S.
- Education: Baylor University
- Spouses: Paige Brown (m. 1994; div. 2008) Audrey Murdick (m. 2012)
- Children: 5

Comedy career
- Years active: 1976–present
- Medium: Stand-up; television; film
- Genres: Observational comedy; black comedy; prop comedy; insult comedy; satire
- Website: jeffdunham.com

Jeffrey Douglas Dunham (born April 18, 1962) is an American ventriloquist, stand-up comedian and actor who has also appeared on numerous television shows, including Late Show with David Letterman, Comedy Central Presents, The Tonight Show, and Sonny with a Chance. He has seven specials that run on Comedy Central as well as two Netflix specials among others. He also starred in The Jeff Dunham Show, a series that ran in 2009. He has a star on the Hollywood Walk of Fame and holds the Guinness Book of World Records record for "Most tickets sold for a stand-up comedy tour" for his Spark of Insanity tour.

Dunham has been called "America's favorite comedian" by Slate. His introduction of Achmed the Dead Terrorist in Spark of Insanity in 2007 was ranked as the ninth most watched YouTube video at the time while his A Very Special Christmas Special was the most-watched telecast in Comedy Central history, with the DVD selling over 400,000 copies in its first two weeks. Forbes ranked Dunham as the third highest-paid comedian in the United States behind Jerry Seinfeld and Chris Rock and reported that he was one of the highest-earning comics from June 2008 to June 2009, earning approximately $30 million during that period.

His style has been described as "a dressed-down, more digestible version of Don Rickles with multiple personality disorder". Time described his characters as "politically incorrect, gratuitously insulting and ill-tempered." Dunham has been credited with reviving ventriloquism.

== Early life ==
Dunham was born on April 18, 1962, in Dallas, Texas. When he was three months old, he was adopted by real estate appraiser Howard Dunham and his homemaker wife Joyce, who raised him in a devoutly Presbyterian household in an affluent Dallas neighborhood, as an only child.

He began ventriloquism in 1970 at age eight, when his parents gave him a Mortimer Snerd dummy for Christmas and an accompanying how-to album. The next day, he checked out a how-to book on ventriloquism from the library. He explained in 2011 that he still had it, remarking that he was "a thief in the third grade". By the fourth grade, Dunham decided he wanted to be not only a professional ventriloquist but also the best one ever. Dunham began practicing for hours in front of a mirror, studying the routines of Edgar Bergen and the how-to record Jimmy Nelson's Instant Ventriloquism, finding ventriloquism to be a learned skill, similar to juggling, that anyone with a normal speaking voice can acquire. Dunham has said that as an only child, he enjoyed being alone, likening his solitude to a "warm blanket" with which he could explore his own thoughts and ideas and which prepared him for the solitude of living alone when he later moved to Los Angeles as a struggling comedian.

When Dunham was in the sixth grade, he began attending the Vent Haven ConVENTion in Fort Mitchell, Kentucky, an annual international meeting of ventriloquists that includes competitions, where he met Jimmy Nelson in person. Dunham has missed only one ConVENTion since then, in 1977. The organizers of the ConVENTion eventually declared Dunham a "retired champion", ineligible from entering any more competitions, because other attendees were too intimidated to compete against him. The Vent Haven Museum devotes a section to Dunham alongside Señor Wences and Dunham's idol, Edgar Bergen.

== Career ==
=== Beginnings ===
Dunham began performing for audiences as a teenager, in various venues such as school, church, and during his job at Six Flags. By his middle school years, he began to perform for banquets attended by local celebrities such as Dallas Cowboys quarterback Roger Staubach, having developed his style of lampooning those he performed for, using the puppets to say things too risque for him to say without them. Dunham's television debut came in 1976 when the still prepubescent performer caught the attention of Dallas reporters like Bill O'Reilly, who interviewed Dunham for a local news story. Dunham later did commercials for Datsun dealerships in Dallas and Tyler while still in high school. While emceeing a high school talent show, he dealt with a heckler, and won over the rest of the audience. During this period he became so associated with his craft that he and one of his dummies "cowrote" a column in the school paper, and he would pose with his dummies for yearbooks as an inexpensive way to acquire professional photos of his act for promotional purposes. He was voted Most Likely to Succeed, and in 1980, after he graduated from high school, Dunham gave himself a career goal of obtaining, within ten years, an appearance on The Tonight Show Starring Johnny Carson, which was seen as the "holy grail" for comedians. He would eventually achieve this goal with less than two months left until the ten year mark.

That year Dunham began attending Baylor University, hoping to graduate with a degree in communications, while performing around campus. He would also fly around the country on weekends, doing up to 100 private shows a year, entertaining corporate customers such as General Electric, whose CEO, Jack Welch, he mocked during his routine. By his junior year in college (1983–84), Dunham was making $70,000 a year, and as word spread of his act, he landed featured spots opening for Bob Hope and George Burns, though he still perceived his act as raw, as he did not have any knowledge of standup comedy beyond his Bill Cosby albums.

He caught a break in 1985 when he was asked to join the Broadway show Sugar Babies with Mickey Rooney and Ann Miller, replacing an outgoing variety act. For the naive and devoutly-raised Dunham, Broadway was a new world filled with beautiful showgirls and crusty stagehands, and his first taste of entertainment industry egos came when Rooney called Dunham into his dressing room, and told him he was there for one reason alone: so that Rooney could change his costumes. He performed at the Westbury Music Fair on Long Island. These early experiences, in which he used characters like José Jalapeño on a Stick, taught him the value of modifying his act regionally, as the jalapeño jokes that worked well in Texas were not as well received by audiences in Long Island. After graduating from Baylor University in 1986, he continued honing his act in comedy clubs in the Southwest with new characters such as Peanut and José Jalapeño, but struggled against the perception he relates from fellow comedians that he was not a true comedian because he relied on props.

His experience at Catch a Rising Star in New York City served as a bitter confirmation of where ventriloquists stood in the comedic food chain, as the emcee at that club gave Dunham little respect. According to Dunham, after he arrived at the club in the evening and informed the emcee that he was a ventriloquist, the emcee reacted with derision, telling Dunham that he would be given a late time slot, and after that time slot came and passed, kept postponing Dunham's stage time until Dunham left the club.

By the end of 1988, Dunham felt his career had gone as far as it could go in Texas, and he moved to Los Angeles, California, never having, as he has commented, "a real job". This concerned his parents, who assumed he would relegate his act to local venues such as church groups. When he first arrived in Los Angeles, the comedy in his act bombed. Dunham attributes this initial reaction to his underdeveloped comedy, explaining that while the characters' personalities were developed at that point, his jokes were not. In addition to this, the comedy world was not welcoming to ventriloquists, and his manager, Judi Brown-Marmel, did not use the word "ventriloquist" when finding bookings for him, choosing to present him as a comedy duo. After Dunham became friends with Mike Lacey, owner of The Comedy & Magic Club in Hermosa Beach, Lacey gave Dunham a steady slot at the club, where Dunham sharpened his act by observing the techniques of comedians like Jerry Seinfeld, and taking the advice of colleague Bill Engvall, moving away from his G-rated material toward edgier, more adult themes.

=== The Tonight Show ===
At the end of 1988, Jim McCawley, a talent booker for The Tonight Show Starring Johnny Carson, told Dunham that he would be given a spot on the coveted program. Though the 26-year-old Dunham was elated that his 10-year goal was arriving two years early, McCawley later cancelled Dunham's appearance after McCawley and Roseanne Barr attended a public performance by Dunham on the day before the taping of Dunham's scheduled Tonight Show appearance. McCawley informed Dunham on the day of the scheduled taping that he had been wrong in his initial assessment of Dunham, whom he now said was not ready for The Tonight Show. Dunham continued to tighten his act in Los Angeles clubs, performing the same 6-minute segment with Peanut a total of nine times for McCawley over the next few months. Finally at the Ice-House in Pasadena in April 1990, after Dunham did the same segment, McCawley informed Dunham that he would finally get his Tonight Show appearance. Dunham and Peanut appeared on The Tonight Show Starring Johnny Carson on April 6, 1990, alongside guests Bob Hope and B.B. King. Following his bit, he was invited to sit on Johnny Carson's couch, a mark of approval on Carson's show. Upon sitting down next to Carson's desk, Dunham pulled out Walter, who told Carson sidekick Ed McMahon, "Stop sending me all your damn mail." At the time, Dunham saw his Tonight Show appearance as his big break, but was frustrated at his parents' initial disapproval over Walter's use of the words "hell" and "damn", and he would toil in obscurity for another 12 years, continuing his stand up at venues such as The Improv chain, and appearing in small roles on TV. One of these was a 1996 episode of Ellen, in which he appeared with Walter. Dunham also appeared with Walter in a TV commercial for Hertz. Dunham would appear on The Tonight Show a total of four times, as well as similar TV venues such as Hot Country Nights, appearing in one segment with Reba McEntire. This exposure helped make Dunham a large theater headliner, a rare accomplishment for a ventriloquist. By the mid-1990s, however, his television appearances had dwindled and, with them, so did his stage audiences.

Dunham moved back to clubs, more than 200 appearances a year. To maintain a connection with his fan base, he would use question cards that he had audiences fill out for his performances to build a database, which was tailor-made for the burgeoning World Wide Web. Though he was voted Funniest Male Standup at the American Comedy Awards in 1998, his club work kept him away from his wife and daughters between two and three weeks each month, which put a strain on his marriage, and made paying bills for his expanded family difficult. By 2002, Dunham was hoping to obtain more TV work to raise his profile and ease his standup schedule. Such exposure was elusive until a successful appearance on The Best Damn Sports Show Period, where Dunham and Walter made jokes at the expense of co-hosts Tom Arnold, Michael Irvin, John Salley and John Kruk, generating laughter from them, and giving Dunham much-needed exposure. In 2003, Dunham was the frontrunner to replace Jimmy Kimmel on Fox NFL Sunday, but hosts Howie Long and Terry Bradshaw were not amenable to the idea of being upstaged by a puppet, and, as Dunham tells it, did not provide a welcoming atmosphere to Dunham, nor allow him to speak much during his appearance.

=== First Comedy Central specials ===
On July 18, 2003, Dunham appeared on Comedy Central Presents, his first solo appearance on Comedy Central. During his half hour piece, he showcased José Jalapeño on a Stick, Walter, an early version of Melvin the Superhero Guy and Peanut, whom Dunham had begun to merchandise into a line of dolls. The appearance was successful, but Comedy Central resisted giving Dunham more airtime, feeling that he was not a good fit for them. By 2005 Dunham decided to gamble on financing his own comedy DVD, Jeff Dunham: Arguing with Myself, which was taped in Santa Ana, California. Dunham's manager, Judi Brown-Marmel, lobbied the network to air it, pointing to Dunham's drawing power and merchandising profits, and arguing that the network needed more diverse content. Surprised by the high ratings of the first Blue Collar Comics concert movie that same year, the network began to reconsider its brand. In late 2006, Comedy Central aired Arguing with Myself, drawing two million viewers when it aired, and selling two million DVDs.

In 2007, Dunham appeared as The Amazing Ken with José Jalapeño on a Stick in the Larry the Cable Guy feature film Delta Farce. His second special, Jeff Dunham: Spark of Insanity, was taped at the Warner Theater in Washington, D.C. that same year. It served not only to cement Dunham's stardom, but to introduce his most controversial character, Achmed the Dead Terrorist, which became a viral Internet sensation. A clip of Achmed from Insanity attracted over 140 million hits on YouTube, making it the ninth most watched clip on that website as of October 2009. He went on to perform the Spark of Insanity international tour where he achieved the Guinness Book of World Records record for "Most tickets sold for a stand-up comedy tour." He performed in 386 venues worldwide, selling 1,981,720 tickets between September 2007 and August 2010.

By 2008, Dunham's characters had crossed language barriers, with his specials dubbed for audiences in various countries such as France, and Dunham attracting requests for performances in South Africa, Australia, Norway, Denmark, China, and the Middle East. Jeff Dunham's Very Special Christmas Special was taped at the Pabst Theater in Milwaukee, Wisconsin that same year, and premiered on Comedy Central on November 16, 2008, watched by 6.6 million people. It became available on DVD and Blu-ray on November 18, 2008. The special's premiere was the highest rated telecast in Comedy Central's history.

In September 2008, his career reached new heights as he began performing in arenas filled with tens of thousands of people. Dunham was somewhat wary of such large venues, but adapted by adjusting the timing of his often rapid exchanges with the puppets so that audience members farthest from the stage could have time to react.

In addition to his comedy specials, Dunham also released his first music album, Don't Come Home for Christmas, on November 4, 2008. It contains original Christmas songs as well as a parody of "Jingle Bells" by Achmed entitled "Jingle Bombs". All the songs, with the exception of "Jingle Bombs", were written and accompanied by Brian Haner, who joined Dunham's act as "Guitar Guy". His first onscreen appearance was in Jeff Dunham's Very Special Christmas Special.

=== 2009–present ===
Dunham performing in 2014

In March 2009, Dunham signed a multi-platform deal with Comedy Central. It included a fourth stand-up special to air in 2010, DVDs, a consumer products partnership, a 60-city tour beginning in September 2010, and an order for a television series called The Jeff Dunham Show that premiered on October 22, 2009. Despite having the most-watched premiere in Comedy Central history, and higher average ratings than other shows on that network initially, the show was canceled after only one season, amid poor reviews, dwindling ratings and higher production costs than other Comedy Central shows.

Dunham appeared in a guest role with Bubba J on NBC's sitcom 30 Rock, playing a ventriloquist named Rick Wayne and his dummy Pumpkin from Stone Mountain, Georgia. In November 2009 Dunham also appeared with Walter in "Hart to Hart", an episode of the Disney Channel series Sonny With a Chance, as two security guards. He appeared in the 2010 Steve Carell/Paul Rudd comedy, Dinner for Schmucks, as Lewis, with a new puppet named Diane.

His fourth special, Controlled Chaos, was released on September 25, 2011, on Comedy Central. It was taped at the Landmark Theater and premiered to an estimated 8.3 million viewers. The DVD received a 5× Platinum certification from the RIAA. He spent the next year performing internationally on the Controlled Chaos Tour. In May 2012, Dunham recorded his fifth special, Minding Monsters, at the Lucas Theater in Savannah, Georgia. It premiered on Comedy Central on October 7, 2012. The DVD received a 4× Platinum certification from the RIAA. Dunham's sixth special, All Over the Map, was released on Comedy Central on November 16, 2014. The show was taped during his performances on five different continents. Also in 2014, Country Music Television premiered Achmed Saves America, an animated film starring Achmed the Dead Terrorist. Dunham released his seventh special, Unhinged in Hollywood, on September 17, 2015. The show was filmed inside the Dolby Theatre and was his first special to premier on NBC.

Dunham performed the North American Perfectly Unbalanced Tour beginning in December 2015. A second leg of the tour ran internationally in 2017, the same year Dunham received a star on the Hollywood Walk of Fame. Beginning in September 2017, he toured North America for his Passively Aggressive Tour. 2017 was also the year he made his Netflix special debut with the release of Relative Disaster. He released Relative Disaster, his second Netflix special, in 2019.

Dunham didn't tour beginning in 2019 due to the COVID-19 pandemic. He began touring again in 2021 with his North America and European Seriously? Tour. In 2022, he began his North American Still Not Cancelled Tour. The same year, Dunham competed in season eight of The Masked Singer as "Pi-Rat" with the character being depicted as a rat in pirate clothing holding a treasure chest that has a smaller "Pi-Rat" in it where that part of the costume is a puppet for Dunham to also operate. He was eliminated on "Vegas Night" alongside Montell Jordan as "Panther". He released his 12th television special, I'm With Cupid, on Comedy Central in February 2024.

== Reception ==
In January 2008, Dunham was voted by fans the Top Comic in Comedy Central's "Stand-Up Showdown". He is the only person to win the "Ventriloquist of the Year" Award twice. He was nominated "Comedian of the Year" by the TNN Music City News Country Awards, and has drawn praise from the Dallas Morning News for his technique and timing. Critics, such as Randee Dawn of The Hollywood Reporter, accused Dunham's characters of being racist caricatures, sexist, and homophobic.

In 2008, a TV commercial for a ringtone which featured Dunham's character Achmed the Dead Terrorist (see characters below) was banned by the South African Advertising Standards Authority (ASA) after a complaint was filed by a citizen stating that the ad was offensive to Muslims, and portrayed all Muslims as terrorists. Dunham responded that "Achmed makes it clear in my act that he is not Muslim." However, the ASA noted that the name Achmed was of Arab origin and was one of the names of Muhammad. Dunham responded, "I've skewered Whites, Blacks, Hispanics, Asians, Christians, Jews, Muslims, gays, straights, rednecks, addicts, the elderly, and my wife. As a standup comic, it is my job to make the majority of people laugh, and I believe that comedy is the last true form of free speech ... I'm considering renaming Achmed 'Bill'", he added. Dunham has conceded that he does exhibit particular sensitivity to the "conservative country crowd" or those characterized by "basic Christian values", as they are one of his largest audiences and a part of his upbringing.

Dunham was heckled and criticized for mocking TV critics during a July 2009 press tour to promote his then-upcoming Comedy Central TV series, The Jeff Dunham Show, as well as Comedy Central programming chief Lauren Correo. In October 2009 The Jeff Dunham Show enjoyed good initial ratings, but was not well liked by critics, some of whom questioned the wisdom of translating his act into a series, or cited Dunham, his previous specials, or ventriloquism itself as reasons for disliking the show.

J. P. Williams, the producer of the Blue Collar Comedy Tour, has opined that Dunham's act is not funny on its own merits, and that his material gets a greater reaction because of the puppet characters than it would otherwise garner by itself. Blue Collar veteran Bill Engvall, a friend of Dunham's, insists otherwise, saying that Dunham is inherently funny with or without the puppets.

In a 2014 show in Malaysia, the government requested that Dunham not use or name Achmed in his show. Due to the restriction for that show, Achmed was renamed "Jacques Merde, the Dead French Terrorist" (Jacques Merde meaning "Jack Shit").

== Books ==
In 2003, Dunham released Dear Walter..., a collection of questions asked of Dunham's fictional curmudgeon at live performances, authored by Dunham and Walter Cummings. His autobiography, All By My Selves: Walter, Peanut, Achmed and Me, was published by Dutton in 2010.

== Characters ==
=== Recurring characters ===
==== Walter ====
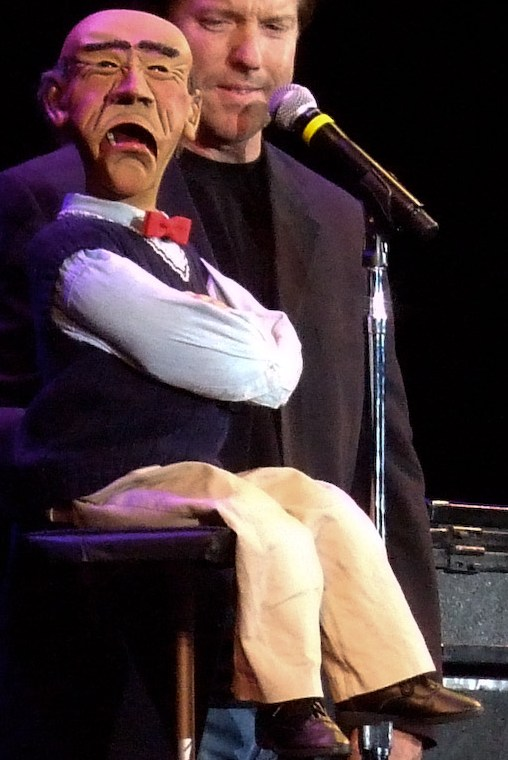
Dunham with Walter in a shot from a 2007 performance

Walter is a retired, grumpy old man with arms always crossed in discontent. Dunham was inspired to create Walter when he watched Bette Davis's final appearance on The Tonight Show Starring Johnny Carson, giving her honest, unfiltered candor to Walter, and patterning Walter's frown on Dunham's own. He has a brash, negative and often sarcastic view on today's world. He is a Vietnam War veteran and a former welder, and "doesn't give a damn" about anyone, especially his own wife and certain audience members. Walter appeared in every Comedy Central special. He's been married for several decades. When Dunham asks him if he remembers the happiest moment of his life after Walter tells him he has been married for forty-six years, Walter responds, "Forty-seven years ago!" Dunham created the Walter puppet himself, including both the initial sculpture and the silicone mold, though he eventually began using professional effects companies for the latter stages with his subsequent puppets.

In the 2020 United States presidential election, Dunham adapted the Walter puppet into "Wonald Grump" and "Ben Hiden," caricatures of Donald Trump and Joe Biden, respectively, for a mock debate moderated by Achmed.

==== Peanut ====
Peanut is a hyperactive, purple-skinned "woozle" with white fur covering most of his body, a tuft of green hair on the top of his head, and one sneaker on his left foot. Dunham explains in Arguing with Myself that Peanut is from a small Micronesian island, and that they met in Florida. Peanut's humor is not based on a particular motif or stereotype, as those of the other characters, and he has been described as "the bad kid". He often makes fun of Dunham, and torments and mocks José Jalapeño on a Stick. Touching upon his unusual appearance and personality, he asks Dunham in Arguing with Myself, after Dunham denies ever having done drugs, "Then how the hell did you come up with me?"

==== José Jalapeño on a Stick ====
José is a talking jalapeño pepper on a stick who wears a small sombrero. José, who speaks with a thick Spanish accent, is typically paired with Peanut, who often makes fun of José, uses appeals to Latino stereotypes when doing so, and makes fun of his being on a stick. Although José was not Dunham's first puppet, it was the first that Dunham made himself.

==== Bubba J ====
Bubba J is a beer-drinking redneck that Dunham describes in Arguing with Myself and A Very Special Christmas Special as "white trash trailer park", and whom Dunham uses for humor centered on such stereotypes. To this end, he frequently does jokes involving Bubba J's love of drinking beer and NASCAR, and his low intelligence. Touching upon such stereotypes, Bubba mentions in Arguing with Myself that he met his wife at a family reunion, and remembers seeing her with a corn dog in one hand, a beer in another, and leaning against a ferris wheel, "making it tilt". Although he does not appear onstage, Bubba appears as the backstage security guard in Controlled Chaos. He was inspired by Edgar Bergen's puppet, Mortimer Snerd.

==== Achmed the Dead Terrorist ====
Achmed is the skeletal corpse of an incompetent suicide bomber, whom Dunham uses to satirize the contemporary issue of terrorism. He is known for yelling, "Silence! I keel you!" to Dunham and people laughing in the audience. Achmed first appeared in Spark of Insanity, and has appeared in every Dunham special since then. In Spark of Insanity the audience learns several things about Achmed. When Dunham says that Achmed must be dead because he's a skeleton, Achmed responds, "It's a flesh wound." When Dunham inquires as to how he died, Achmed explains his incompetence with explosives, while also casting aspersions on Dunham's sexual prowess by saying that they both suffer from "premature detonation". Although he frequently mentions working for Osama bin Laden, Achmed denies being a Muslim and says "Look at my ass! It says 'Made in China'!" He says he is afraid of Walter, partially because he's "one mean son of a bitch" and finds Walter's flatulence to be more potent than Saddam Hussein's mustard gas. In Very Special Christmas Special, he sings a song called "Jingle Bombs".

By June 2009, the sketch in which Dunham introduced Achmed had amassed nearly 200 million views on YouTube. The large, round, articulated eyes of puppets such as Achmed and Achmed Junior are constructed by the same effects artist who created the dinosaur eyes for the Jurassic Park films. The character starred in Achmed Saves America, an animated film that premiered on Country Music Television in March 2014. In the film, which depicts the mishap that led to the character's skeletonization, Achmed finds himself in an American town called Americaville, which he plots to blow up, before developing an affinity for American culture.

=== Non-recurring and retired characters ===
==== Sweet Daddy Dee ====
Dunham introduces Sweet Daddy Dee in Arguing with Myself as his "new manager". He calls himself a "pimp", which he says stands for "Player In the Management Profession." According to Sweet Daddy, because he is a pimp, that makes Jeff the "ho". When Dunham objects, Daddy Dee points out that Dunham makes people laugh and feel good for a living. When Dunham agrees that this is the case, Daddy Dee says "You a ho." When Dunham asks what he would say if he told him that he was a comedian only because he enjoyed it, Daddy Dee responds "You a dumb ho." Unlike Bubba J, he hates NASCAR. Sweet Daddy's headstone is featured in the beginning of the special Minding the Monsters.

==== Melvin the Superhero Guy ====
Melvin wears a blue superhero costume, and is used to poke fun at superheroes. When asked about his superhuman powers, he indicates that he has X-ray vision. Dunham portrays Melvin as unimpressed with other superheroes. Melvin's first onscreen appearance was in the July 2003 Comedy Central Presents episode, in which he had small, black, beady eyes. By his next appearance, in Spark of Insanity, he had been modified to have large, blue, crossed eyes. He has an enormous nose, which he claims is his symbol, and whose similarity in shape to that of a penis is alluded to in the act. Dunham sculpted the current version of Melvin's head himself, and hired an effects company called Renegade Effects Groups to create the rubber mold and complete the puppet, before then installing the mechanics himself. Melvin's headstone is featured in the beginning of the special Minding the Monsters.

==== Little Jeff ====
Little Jeff is a miniature version of Dunham himself, usually dressed in the same clothes Dunham wears during each show. His first onscreen appearance was in the 1989 television program A&E's An Evening at The Improv. He later appeared in Jeff Dunham: Controlled Chaos as a puppet that Peanut used when attempting his hand at ventriloquism. Peanut named the doll "Little Ugly Ass-Jeff", and uses him to insult Dunham.

==== Diane ====
Diane first appeared with Dunham in the 2010 film Dinner for Schmucks as "Debbie", his character's "wife". She made her stand-up debut in Dunham's Identity Crisis Tour 2010.

==== Achmed Junior ====
Achmed Junior is the estranged son of Achmed. He was designed by Mad magazine illustrator Tom Richmond. He first appeared during the Identity Crisis Tour 2010, and made his first onscreen appearance in Dunham's fourth special, Jeff Dunham: Controlled Chaos. Like his father, Achmed Junior is the victim of a bomb, which resulted in the destruction of half of his face and body. He speaks with a British accent because he was raised in Britain after the accident. Much to his father's consternation, he expresses an attraction to Dunham's male stage hand, Marnell, when Marnell appears on stage to address Achmed's loss of balance (often with duct tape). Conflict also stems from the fact that unlike his father, Achmed Junior does not wish to be a suicide bomber.

==== Seamus ====
Seamus is a grumpy, beer-drinking, Irish infant who first appears in Relative Disaster, which was filmed in Ireland. Dunham, himself an adopted child, introduces him as a son that he has adopted in order to "pay it forward". Despite being an infant, he is a belligerent heavy drinker, traits with which Dunham pokes fun at Irish stereotypes. Dunham also establishes Seamus as a fan of United States President Donald Trump in order to poke fun at Trump, Hillary Clinton, and the 2016 United States presidential election.

==== Larry the Adviser ====
Larry is the personal adviser to Donald Trump. He has unkempt orange hair, big bulgy eyes and has a cigarette in one hand. Jeff lightly shakes him to give the feeling of jitteriness. Larry is constantly on edge and is implied to be unnerved for having worked with Trump for "four hours". He nevertheless "supports" the president.

==== Little Peanut ====
Little Peanut is a miniature version of Peanut that Dunham has used to counter Peanut's use of Little Jeff.

==== Url ====
In the 2022 special Jeff Dunham: Me the People, Dunham introduced a new puppet named Url, a young person who is always preoccupied with using his mobile device. Dunham explained the creation of the character, saying, "Everybody gets stuck on their devices. Ninety-nine percent of us gets stuck on our smart devices too much of the time, so we can identify with that. Children are on them too much. Parents have to deal with it. Kids complain because their parents are on them too much. So everybody knows somebody stuck on the smart device. So I thought, I'm going to create a younger guy that also has the problem of living in his parents' basement. So many families are dealing with that now. The kids come back and won't go away."

== Personal life ==
Dunham met his first wife, Paige Brown, at the Comedy Corner in West Palm Beach, Florida. They began dating in December 1992. In May 1994, Dunham married Brown and adopted her one-and-a-half-year-old daughter, Bree. Their daughters Ashlyn and Kenna were born in 1995 and 1997, respectively. Dunham's time away while performing proved a strain on the marriage and, in November 2008, he filed for divorce.

By mid-2009, Dunham was in a relationship with Audrey Murdick, a certified nutritionist, personal trainer, and competition bodybuilder. On December 25, 2011, they became engaged to be married. On October 12, 2012, the couple married. On May 14, 2015, Dunham announced, via Facebook, that he and Audrey were expecting twin boys. In October, she gave birth to James Jeffrey and Jack Steven.

In addition to building the dummies he uses in his act, Dunham restores antique dummies as a hobby, one of which is The Umpire, a 6-foot-tall (1.8 m) mechanized dummy built in 1941 to work the plate at a girls' softball game. The Umpire was unused and was packed away for 50 years before Dunham acquired it in early 2008.

Dunham has had a love of helicopters since childhood and is fond of building and flying his own kit helicopters from Rotorway helicopter kits. At the time he finished writing his autobiography in June 2010, he was beginning to build his fourth kit. He is also an aficionado of muscle cars and Apple, Inc. products. According to the July 16, 2012, television documentary The Batmobile, Dunham owns the original Batmobile used in the Tim Burton film Batman, which he had outfitted with a Corvette engine to make it street legal.

== Tours ==
| Tour | Dates^{(non-inclusive)} | Countries^{(in order of first show)} | Notes |
|---|---|---|---|
| Spark of Insanity | Sept. 8, 2007 – Jan. 9, 2010 | United States, Canada, United Kingdom, Sweden, Denmark, Finland, Norway, Australia | Achieved the Guinness Book of World Records record for "Most tickets sold for a stand-up comedy tour." It was performed in 386 venues worldwide, selling 1,981,720 tickets between September 2007 and August 2010. |
| Identity Crisis | Jan. 9, 2010 – Sept. 24, 2011 | United States, Canada, Netherlands, Ireland, United Kingdom, South Africa, Switzerland, Belgium, Norway, Sweden, France | |
| Controlled Chaos | Oct. 6, 2011 – Sept. 30, 2012 | United States, Canada, United Kingdom, Germany, Belgium, Ireland, South Africa, Australia, New Zealand | |
| Disorderly Conduct | Nov. 1, 2012 – Sept. 28, 2014 | Canada, United States, Denmark, Belgium, Netherlands, Iceland, Sweden, Norway, Ireland, United Kingdom, United Arab Emirates, Israel, South Africa, Australia, Malaysia, Singapore | |
| Not Playing With a Full Deck | Nov. 28, 2014– Oct. 5, 2015 | United States | All shows at Planet Hollywood Resort & Casino, Las Vegas, Nevada. |
| Perfectly Unbalanced | Dec. 2, 2015 – Sept. 13, 2017 | United States, Canada | Dunham received a star on the Hollywood Walk of Fame during this tour. |
| Passively Aggressive | Sept. 28, 2017 – May 5, 2018 | United States, Canada | |
| Seriously!? | July 10, 2021 – Dec. 12, 2022 | United States, Canada, Europe | First tour since the COVID-19 pandemic began |
| Still Not Canceled | Dec. 28, 2022 – present | United States, Canada | |

== Filmography ==
Documentaries and specials

| Year | Title | Notes |
|---|---|---|
| 1991 | Hot Country Nights | One episode |
| 2003 | Comedy Central Presents | Also writer |
| 2006 | Jeff Dunham: Arguing with Myself | TV special; also writer and executive producer |
| 2007 | Jeff Dunham: Spark of Insanity | TV special; also writer and executive producer |
| 2008 | History of the Joke | TV documentary |
| 2008 | Jeff Dunham's Very Special Christmas Special | TV special; also writer, executive producer and songwriter |
| 2009 | I'm No Dummy | Documentary film |
| 2011 | Jeff Dunham: Controlled Chaos | TV special; also writer and executive producer |
| 2012 | The Batmobile | TV documentary |
| 2012 | Jeff Dunham: Minding the Monsters | TV special; also writer and executive producer |
| 2014 | Jeff Dunham: All Over the Map | TV special; also writer, executive producer and co-editor |
| 2015 | Jeff Dunham: Unhinged in Hollywood | TV special |
| 2016 | Hell's Kitchen | Episode: "9 Chefs Compete" (with Walter) |
| 2017 | Jeff Dunham: Relative Disaster | Netflix special |
| 2019 | Jeff Dunham: Beside Himself | Netflix special |
| 2020 | Jeff Dunham's Completely Unrehearsed Last-Minute Pandemic Holiday Special | TV special; also writer |
| 2022 | Jeff Dunham: Me The People | TV special |
| 2024 | Jeff Dunham: I'm With Cupid | TV special |
| 2024 | Jeff Dunham's Scrooged-Up Holiday Special | Amazon Prime special |

Acting

| Year | Title | Role | Notes |
|---|---|---|---|
| 1996 | Ellen | Starky the Ventriloquist | Episode: "When the Vow Breaks: Part 1" (with Walter as Gus) |
| 2002 | Any Day Now | Ventriloquist | Episode: "Truth Hurts" |
| 2002 | She Spies | Elvis Presley ventriloquist | Episode: "Ice Man" |
| 2003 | One on One | Benny / Kenny | Episode: "I Know What You Did Last Thursday" |
| 2005 | Blue Collar TV | Ventriloquist | Episode: "Stupidity" |
| 2007 | Delta Farce | Amazing Ken | First feature-length movie |
| 2009 | 30 Rock | Rick Wayne | Episode: "Stone Mountain" (with Bubba J. as Pumpkin) |
| 2009 | The Jeff Dunham Show | Himself | 7 episodes; also writer and executive producer |
| 2009 | Sonny with a Chance | Jeff | Episode: "Hart to Hart" (with Walter) |
| 2010 | Dinner for Schmucks | Lewis the Ventriloquist | With Diane |
| 2012 | Big Top Scooby-Doo! | Schmatko, Conductor | Voice, direct-to-video |
| 2013 | From Up on Poppy Hill | Gen | Voice, English dub |
| 2014 | The Nut Job | Mole | Voice |
| 2014 | Achmed Saves America | Achmed, Bubba J., Himself | Video; creator, executive producer and original character designer |
| 2017 | Smurfs: The Lost Village | Farmer Smurf | Voice |
| 2017 | The Nut Job 2: Nutty by Nature | Mole | Voice |
| 2017 | Mune: Guardian of the Moon | Phospho | Voice |
| 2017 | Gnome Alone | Quiksilver | Voice |
| 2018 | Elliot the Littlest Reindeer | Clyde, Peanutbutter | Voice |
| 2020 | Scooby-Doo and Guess Who? | Himself | Voice, episode: "Too Many Dummies!" |
| 2020 | Tacoma FD | Ventriloquist | TV series, 1 episode |
| 2021 | Last Man Standing | Himself (cameo) | Episode: "Meatless Mike" |
| 2022 | The Masked Singer | Himself / Pi-Rat | Season 8 contestant |
| 2026 | The Hunting Party | Jeff Miller | Episode: "Dylan Miles" |
