= The Jeff Dunham Show =

- The series intertitle.
- Genre: Sketch comedy Reality show
- Created by: Jeff Dunham
- Written by: Jeff Dunham; Ross McCall; Aaron Peters; Jeff Rothpan; Michael Dugan; Ian Busch; Jason Mayland; CeCe Pleasants; Matt Price
- Directed by: Manny Rodriguez
- Starring: Jeff Dunham
- Composers: Brian Haner; Synyster Gates
- Country of origin: United States
- Original language: English
- No. of seasons: 1
- No. of episodes: 7

Production
- Executive producers: Jeff Dunham; Ross McCall; Aaron Peters; Judi Brown-Marmel; Robert Hartmann; Stu Schreiberg
- Producer: Cathy A. Cambria
- Production location: Los Angeles, CA
- Running time: approx. 22 minutes
- Production companies: Levity Productions, Whiteboard Entertainment

Original release
- Network: Comedy Central
- Release: October 22 – December 10, 2009

The Jeff Dunham Show is an American sketch comedy television series starring comedian Jeff Dunham, that aired on the American cable television network Comedy Central. It premiered on October 22, 2009, and featured Dunham interacting with the characters that he uses in his ventriloquism act, such as Walter, Achmed the Dead Terrorist, Bubba J, Peanut, José Jalapeño on a Stick, and Sweet Daddy Dee. The series' final episode aired on December 10, 2009.

On December 29, 2009, it was announced that The Jeff Dunham Show would not return for a second season, despite having higher average ratings than other Comedy Central shows; Nellie Andreeva of The Live Feed cited its higher production cost as a factor.

The entire series run is included on The Jeff Dunham Show DVD, which was released on May 18, 2010.

== Production ==
The series, which has been described as "broader and cleaner" than Dunham's standup act, was part of a multi-platform deal Dunham signed in March 2009 that includes further stand-up specials, DVDs, a consumer product partnership, and a tour. It combines segments with Dunham and his characters onstage in front of a live audience with segments where the characters visit real people and places around Los Angeles.

== Episodes ==
=== Episode 1 ===
In the pilot episode, Walter and Jeff visit a licensed psychologist to help them with their personal conflict, Achmed stars in a stand-up comedy DVD, Peanut meets pop singer and reality TV star Brooke Hogan, and Bubba J visits a real rifle range.

=== Episode 2 ===
Achmed throws himself a funeral, Peanut gets Walter to interview Good Charlotte, and Bubba J recounts the day Walter was examined by, as Walter calls her, "a woman doctor".

=== Episode 3 ===
Achmed tries to become an American citizen, Walter hosts a segment called "Walter's Technology Minute", Sweet Daddy Dee tries to get more black people to watch the show, and Peanut stars in an infomercial about an energy drink he invented based on his catchphrase "Neow!". José Jalepeño on a Stick appears during Walter's segment.

=== Episode 4 ===
Peanut records a dance song with "Kundry Black", Bubba J visits Dr. Hsu (the doctor who examined Walter in the second episode), and a psychologist to ease his fear of doctors and hospitals, and Achmed watches his first adult film. José Jalepeño on a Stick appears at the end of Bubba J's skit.

=== Episode 5 ===
Sweet Daddy Dee tries to understand Civil War reenactments, Achmed records his own ringtones, Walter tries to get a vacation for his wife for their anniversary, and Bubba J tries to "drunk-proof" a family's home.

=== Episode 6 ===
Peanut tries to get dancers for the show, Walter shows off his relationship advice segment (first shown in episode 4), Achmed once again tries to become an American citizen by joining the Marines, and Bubba J records his own ringtones.

=== Episode 7 ===
In the series' finale, Bubba J enters a rehabilitation center, Walter does his weekly apology to his wife in advance, Achmed tries to sell terrorism against America, and Walter records his own ringtones. Peanut appears during Bubba J's skit.

A skit featuring Sweet Daddy Dee trying to make an a cappella group acquainted with some Germans who run a bar below where the group practices was filmed, but not ever shown on the show. It can be viewed on the show's DVD, however. Several parts in the skit parody the 1965 film The Sound of Music.

== Ratings and critical reception ==
The show opened to universally unfavorable reviews. It scored a 20 out of 100 on Metacritic, based on 7 reviews by critics, most of whom either questioned the wisdom of the series’ concept, or conceded a prejudice against Dunham, his previous Comedy Central specials, or ventriloquism itself. Others, like The Hollywood Reporter’s Randee Dawn, criticized the puppets as “racist caricatures.”

The show's premiere episode drew 5.3 million viewers, making it the highest Comedy Central premiere of all time, but in its second week, saw a 55% decrease, drawing 2.3 million viewers, a drop that was partially attributed to the World Series drawing sports fans from the show.

== Cancellation ==
On December 29, 2009, TV Guide reported that The Jeff Dunham Show would not be renewed for a second season, noting that despite the strong premiere, the series' ratings had dropped sharply by the season finale.
