= Jeff Dunham: Arguing with Myself =

- Genre: Comedy
- Written by: Jeff Dunham
- Directed by: Manny Rodriguez
- Starring: Jeff Dunham
- Country of origin: United States
- Original language: English

Production
- Executive producers: Judi Brown-Marmel; Jeff Dunham; Robert Hartmann; Steve Kroopnick; Stu Schreiberg
- Producer: Jeff Rothpan
- Production locations: Santa Ana, California, United States
- Camera setup: Multi-camera
- Running time: 76 mins
- Production company: Levity Productions

Original release
- Network: Comedy Central
- Release: April 8, 2006

Related
- Jeff Dunham: Spark of Insanity

Arguing with Myself is a stage performance of comedian and ventriloquist Jeff Dunham. The show was taped in Santa Ana, California. The DVD was released on April 11, 2006.

== Characters ==
- Walter - A grumpy old Vietnam War veteran with an attitude who frequently complains about his wife.
- Sweet Daddy Dee - Jeff's new manager from the street who says he's a "Player In the Management Profession. PIMP." According to Sweet Daddy, that makes Jeff the "ho".
- Bubba J - In Jeff's own words, "Pretty much just white-trash trailer-park." He talks about NASCAR and his love of beer.
- Peanut - A purple woozle from Micronesia described by Walter as "a frickin' Muppet on crack." He wears one red Converse shoe on his left foot.
- José Jalapeño on a Stick - a jalapeño pepper on a stick, or "steek" as he says it with a Hispanic accent.

== DVD release ==
The special was released on DVD and on Blu-ray Disc later. This was the first special that had a choice of the censored or uncensored versions of the special. The only other two with that choice are Controlled Chaos and Minding the Monsters. The DVD's special feature include:

- "Puppet bloopers" - Two bloopers, Peanut's hair flies off and Walter arms uncross.
- "Violation of the Peanut Doll" - Walter introduces a video of a small dog humping a Peanut doll.
- "Walter's Goodbye" - The camera approaches Walter and Walter states he doesn't do interviews and he'll "kick your ass to Calcutta".
- "Audio Commentary" - Commentary on the special by Jeff and Kelly Asbury (author of the book, Dummy Days and co-directed Shrek 2).

== Chart performance ==
Chart (2008)	Peak position
US Heatseekers Albums (Billboard)	43
US Top Comedy Albums (Billboard)	12

== Certifications and sales ==
Region	Certification	Certified units/sales
United States (RIAA) DVD	20× Platinum	2,000,000^{^}
^{^} Shipments figures based on certification alone.
