= Dunkeld West =

- Location within Gauteng Location within South Africa
- Coordinates: 26°08′05″S 28°01′58″E
- Country: South Africa
- Province: Gauteng
- Municipality: City of Johannesburg

Area
  - Total: 0.27 km^{2} (0.10 sq mi)

Population (2001)
  - Total: 371
  - Density: 1,400/km^{2} (3,600/sq mi)
- Time zone: UTC+2 (SAST)
- Postal code (street): 2196

Dunkeld West is a suburb of Johannesburg, South Africa. It is located in Region B of the City of Johannesburg Metropolitan Municipality.

== History ==
Proclaimed in 1928 as an extension of the existing suburb of Dunkeld.
