= Jason Blundell =

American video game producer and creative director

- Born: United Kingdom
- Occupations: Video game producer, designer, creative director
- Employer(s): Treyarch (2006–2020); Deviation Games (2020-2022); Dark Outlaw Games (2023–2026); Magic Fractal (2026-present)
- Known for: Call of Duty series
- Title: Studio Head, Co-Studio Head, Game Director, Campaign Design Director, Senior Executive Producer, Assistant Producer

Jason Blundell is a British video game producer and creative director. He is best known for his work on the Call of Duty Zombies franchise.

== Career ==
Blundell began his career at Activision as a Programmer and Producer for several titles, before joining Treyarch to work on the production of Call of Duty 3. He went on to become Executive Producer for Call of Duty: Black Ops, Campaign Design Director for Call of Duty: Black Ops II, and Game Director for both the Campaign and Zombies modes of Call of Duty: Black Ops III, taking over from Jimmy Zielinski.

Blundell directed and produced the Career and Zombies experiences of Call of Duty: Black Ops 4, and co-created the story for the Zombies Comics. He and Craig Houston served as co-creators for the Chaos storyline in the Zombies franchise.

On February 28, 2020, Treyarch announced Jason Blundell was leaving the studio. On June 10, 2021, Blundell and Dave Anthony announced a new studio, Deviation Games. On September 8, 2022, it was announced that Blundell had left Deviation Games. The studio had significant layoffs in May 2023 and shut down in March 2024. In December 2023, Jason was revealed to be working at PlayStation Studios. In March 2025, Blundell announced that he had created and was leading a new first-party studio under PlayStation Studios called Dark Outlaw Games, with a game in active development at that time. In March 2026, it was reported by Jason Schreier that Dark Outlaw games was closing down. Since, he has formed a new studio called Magic Fractal, about which little is currently known.

== Writing style ==
Blundell is inspired by multi-layered narratives and morally grey characters. During an interview for Call of Duty: Black Ops III, Blundell has said there are "three or four stories running at the same time." He is known for his overtly cryptic storytelling and Easter Eggs, and has a fascination with Dystopia and Mythology.

== Games ==
- Starlancer
- X2: Wolverine's Revenge
- Catwoman
- Xanadu Next
- The Roots: Gates of Chaos
- Call of Duty 3
- Spider-Man 3
- 007: Quantum of Solace
- Call of Duty: World at War
- Call of Duty: Black Ops
- Call of Duty: Black Ops II
- Call of Duty: Black Ops III
- Call of Duty: Modern Warfare Remastered
- Call of Duty: Black Ops 4
