= David Vonderhaar =

American video game producer and creative director

- Born: September 8, 1972 (age 53); Cincinnati, Ohio, U.S.
- Occupation: Video game designer
- Employers: Treyarch (2005–2023); BulletFarm (2024–present)
- Known for: Call of Duty series
- Title: Studio design director, online manager, multiplayer designer

David Vonderhaar, also known as Vahn, (born September 8, 1972) is an American video game developer and game designer. He is best known for his work on the Call of Duty Black Ops franchise.

== Career ==
Vonderhaar joined Activision to become a quality assurance tester, web designer, and online manager for several titles. In 2006, he led the design of Call of Duty 3 and several other Call of Duty games developed by Treyarch. He designed the multiplayer systems for Call of Duty: Black Ops and Call of Duty: Black Ops II, along with the campaign, multiplayer, and free run modes for Call of Duty: Black Ops III.

Vonderhaar led the design systems for the campaign and multiplayer experiences of Call of Duty: Black Ops 4, before transitioning to full-time development on Blackout after the campaign mode was cancelled. He also worked on the multiplayer of Call of Duty: Black Ops Cold War and its Fireteam modes.

On August 18, 2023, Vonderhaar announced that he had left Treyarch, after eighteen years. He established NetEase's company BulletFarm.

== Design philosophy ==
Vonderhaar has a competitive-focused agenda and is inspired by Esports gameplay design. Vonderhaar has spoken on the development of League Play, a competitive mode introduced in Call of Duty: Black Ops II, and their goal to make Treyarch games "fun to play, and fun to watch". Starting with Call of Duty: Black Ops, Vonderhaar worked closely with competitive players and Esports professionals to improve the spectating and gameplay experience of Call of Duty.

== Games ==
- Dark Reign: The Future of War
- Nightmare Creatures
- Barrage
- Interstate '82
- Civilization: Call to Power
- Shanghai: Second Dynasty
- Trivial Pursuit: Unhinged
- X-Men Legends II: Rise of Apocalypse
- Call of Duty 2: Big Red One
- Call of Duty 3
- 007: Quantum of Solace
- Call of Duty: World at War
- Call of Duty: Black Ops
- Call of Duty: Black Ops II
- Call of Duty: Advanced Warfare
- Call of Duty: Black Ops III
- Call of Duty: Black Ops 4
- Call of Duty: Black Ops Cold War
- Call of Duty: Warzone
