= Call of Duty: Black Ops 4 =

2018 video game

- Developer: Treyarch (Note: Windows version developed by Beenox. Additional development work by Raven Software, Sledgehammer Games, High Moon Studios & Demonware.)
- Publisher: Activision
- Director: Jason Blundell
- Designer: David Vonderhaar
- Writers: Craig Houston; Dave Anthony
- Composer: Jack Wall (Note: Brian Tuey and Kevin Sherwood composed the Aether story theme and additional music tracks for the Zombies mode.)
- Series: Call of Duty
- Engine: IW (modified)
- Platforms: PlayStation 4; Windows; Xbox One
- Release: October 12, 2018
- Genre: First-person shooter
- Modes: Single-player, multiplayer

Call of Duty: Black Ops 4 (Note: Stylized as Call of Duty: Black Ops IIII) is a 2018 first-person shooter game developed by Treyarch and published by Activision. It is the fifteenth installment of the Call of Duty series and the fifth entry in the Black Ops sub-series, following Call of Duty: Black Ops III (2015). The game was released on October 12, 2018, for PlayStation 4, Windows, and Xbox One.

Black Ops 4 is the first mainline Call of Duty title to not include a single-player campaign. Instead, it features the Specialist HQ, which details the backstories of the multiplayer mode's characters, known as "Specialists"; its missions are set between Call of Duty: Black Ops II (2012) and Black Ops III chronologically. The multiplayer component is the first in the series to not feature automatic health regeneration and introduces both predictive recoil and a new ballistics system. The cooperative Zombies mode also returned, with four maps available on release day. Additionally, Black Ops 4 features a battle royale mode called Blackout, which features up to 100 players in each match.

During the development cycle of Black Ops 4, Treyarch initially planned to include a campaign-like mode in the game, titled "Career", which was intended to continue the story of Black Ops III, but the mode was scrapped in early 2018 due to technical concerns, timing, and negative feedback from play-testers; the team resorted to creating the Blackout battle royale mode as a replacement for Career. Teasing of the game began in March 2018; a full reveal took place later in May. Two betas were held for Black Ops 4, one for the multiplayer component in August and one for Blackout in September.

Pre-release reception of the game was negative due to the game's lack of a campaign mode and the Black Ops Pass, a season pass that distributes downloadable content (DLC) in the form of "Operations". Upon release, Black Ops 4 received positive reviews from critics, with praise directed towards Blackout. It drew criticism for the design of its microtransactions implemented in updates. Retrospective reviews have been mixed, although all three of its modes have received praise. Despite grossing over $500 million in worldwide sales within its first three days of release, Black Ops 4 ultimately failed to meet Activision's overall sales expectations. The game was followed by Call of Duty: Black Ops Cold War (2020).

== Gameplay ==
Black Ops 4 is a first-person shooter. Unlike previous entries in the Call of Duty series, Black Ops 4 is the first entry to not feature a traditional single-player campaign, and contains only Multiplayer, Zombies and a new battle royale mode called Blackout.

=== Multiplayer ===
Black Ops 4's multiplayer features the return of Specialists, unique soldier characters with special abilities and traits. At launch, the game featured a total of ten Specialists, six of which (Ruin, Prophet, Battery, Seraph, Nomad, Firebreak) are returning characters from Black Ops III, while the other four (Recon, Ajax, Torque, Crash) are new additions. Unlike Black Ops III, the game allows only two unique Specialist per team, in order to emphasize the role of each character. Following launch, more Specialists (Zero, Outrider, Spectre, Reaper) were added to the roster, with unique weaponry and equipment.

Multiplayer has also been reworked with various changes for more tactical and team focused gameplay. Automatic health regeneration is removed in favor of a manual healing system (with each player having a health bar), weapons are now given predictive recoil patterns, and a mixed ballistics system, using both hitscan and projectile damage, is employed as opposed to just hitscan. Weapon customization is also emphasized, allowing for deeper personalization of players' arsenals; attachments are also given tiers, with tier-2 upgrades providing even bigger improvements to the weapons. Certain weapons also offer Operator Mods, which significantly change how a weapon works, while costing a significant portion of the 10 customization slots per class. A new Gear slot was also implemented in create-a-class, allowing for the selection of a single powerful item such as Body Armor.

In addition, the game includes Specialist Headquarters, a solo mode featuring short tutorials (known as Onboarding missions) that feature backstories on various Specialists in the game. The missions are set within the same narrative world of the Black Ops campaigns, between the events of Black Ops II and Black Ops III.

=== Zombies ===
Zombies returns as the cooperative multiplayer mode for Black Ops 4. The game mode features a wider range of customization, allowing for more personalized play styles. Mechanics of the game can be customized via "Custom Mutations", which include over 100 variables, such as overall difficulty, zombie speed, health, damage, and more. Time-limited events known as "Callings" are also promised to be included in the game for long-term engagement. Similar to the Nazi Zombies mode in Call of Duty: WWII, custom loadouts are included to allow players to select different starting weapons, equipment and special upgradable weapons, as well as perk selection to be available in each match. A new game type, Rush, is introduced into Zombies, where the players build up points and multipliers and compete against one another for the highest point possible until death. Black Ops 4 features a new form of consumable items called Elixirs, which grant temporary buffs to the players upon activation; and Talismans, special modifiers that are applied at the start of each match. Elixirs are provided in five types: Classic, Common, Rare, Legendary and Epic; the first is unlocked permanently via player progression, while the latter four are consumable and only craftable using the in-game currency. Talismans are also consumable, and can only be acquired in the same method.

Black Ops 4 is also the first game to feature two distinctive, separate storylines for Zombies. At launch, the game features three on-disc maps: "Voyage of Despair", which takes place on the RMS Titanic; "IX", which takes place in an Gladiatorial Arena in Roman Egypt; and "Blood of the Dead", a soft-remake of the Black Ops II map "Mob of the Dead", taking place once more in Alcatraz Federal Penitentiary. The former two maps form the new "Chaos" storyline, and star a new cast of characters: Scarlett, Shaw, Diego and Bruno; while "Blood of the Dead" returns to the original "Aether" storyline established in the previous Black Ops games, and stars the four original characters (Dempsey, Nikolai, Takeo, Richtofen; also known collectively as Primis). A fourth map, titled "Classified", is included in the special editions of the game and the "Black Ops Pass" at launch, and is a remake of the Black Ops map "Five", featuring the original incarnation of Primis (known as Ultimis) as the playable characters. The map "Dead of the Night" features a celebrity cast, in maintaining tradition of previous Black Ops games containing one Zombies map with playable characters portrayed by celebrities.

=== Blackout ===
Black Ops 4 features a battle royale game mode called Blackout which serves as a stand-in for the campaign mode. While utilizing the traditional Black Ops combat style, the mode includes the largest map featured in a Call of Duty title. Players compete against each other through locations appeared in previous Black Ops games. This mode will also feature land, sea, and air vehicles for players to use. The game mode features various playable characters from the entire Black Ops series, such as Alex Mason from the original game, Raul Menendez from Black Ops II, and the Primis crew from Zombies.

In Blackout, up to 100 players, who can choose to play as Solo, Duos, or Quads (squads of 4), drop into the map via helicopters, and must scavenge for loot to survive as the last person(s) standing, while a circle collapses and narrows the map's playable area. In addition to regular weapons, players can equip health kits, armors, ammo types, attachments, as well as perk consumables. AI-controlled zombie enemies also spawn at Zombies-themed locations, such as Asylum or Lighthouse, and upon being killed drop Zombies loot items, such as the Ray Gun or Cymbal Monkey. Several vehicles, such as the ATV and helicopter, are also available for traversal around the map.

Similar to Fortnite Battle Royale and the main multiplayer, Blackout features special modes that change the presence or mechanics of physical items in the Blackout world. Modes such as 'Close Quarters' emphasise a faster and more aggressive playstyle through the exclusion of long-range weapons, while others like 'Fast Collapse' feature a faster narrowing of the circle. Later updates included a different map, called 'Alcatraz', which features a significantly smaller map, which is supposed to represent Alcatraz Island. Main differences between Alcatraz and the regular map include the fact that only 40 players are allowed per match, there are respawns included, and no vehicles are present.

== Synopsis ==
=== Characters and settings ===
The Multiplayer and Blackout modes take place in the 2040s, and are centered around the Specialists, a group of global elite soldiers hired by researcher Savannah Mason-Meyer (Evangeline Lilly), granddaughter of Alex Mason (Sam Worthington). The initial Specialist roster includes: infantryman Donnie "Ruin" Walsh (Christian Rummel), demolitions expert Erin "Battery" Baker (Morla Gorrondona), Medical Sergeant Jarrah "Crash" Bazley (Mark Coles Smith), militia officer Kerk "Ajax" Rossouw (Stelio Savante), JGSDF soldier Katsumi "Recon" Kimura (Daisuke Tsuji), former British Army Corporal Kieran "Torque" Mackay (Matthew Waterson), ex-arsonist Krystof "Firebreak" Hejek (Adam Gifford), 54 Immortals enforcer He "Seraph" Zhen-Zhen (Judy Alice Lee), survivalist Tavo "Nomad" Rojas (David Cooley), and engineer David "Prophet" Wilkes (Dwane Walcott). Additional Specialists later join the roster, including: hacker Leni "Zero" Vogel (Stephanie Lemelin), scoutswoman Alessandra "Outrider" Castillo (Loreni Delgado), assassin Spectre (Roger Garcia), and combat robot EWR-115 "Reaper" (Keith Silverstein). Other characters featured in the Specialist Stories include: Jessica Mason-Green (Alexa Kahn), Savannah's sister and a former squad mate of Ruin and Battery; Sergeant Frank Woods (James C. Burns), Mason's best friend who appears as an instructor in the Specialists' training program; Viktor Reznov (Piotr Michael), a Red Army soldier who was Mason's ally prior to his death; and Raul Menendez (Kamar de los Reyes), former leader of the terrorist organization Cordis Die who plays a vital supporting role in Savannah's research.

The Chaos story of Zombies mode features a new cast of characters, starring: adventurer Scarlett Rhodes (Courtenay Taylor), former French Foreign Legion soldier Bruno Delacroix (Andrew Morgado), Mexican spy Diego Necalli (Christian Lanz), and British chemist Stanton Shaw (Nick Boraine). Scarlett leads the other three in search of her father, Alistair (Charles Dennis), who has mysteriously disappeared following an encounter with the Order, an ancient cult worshiping a dark power led by the High Priest (Fred Tatasciore). Dead of the Night, a prequel to Scarlett's story, features a different crew of characters, who are Alistair's associates: the Rhodes family butler Godfrey (Charles Dance), stage show cowboy Gideon Jones (Kiefer Sutherland), phony psychic Christina Fowler (Helena Bonham Carter), and Brigadier General Jonathan Warwick (Brian Blessed). Other characters include the Oracle of Delphi (Cissy Jones), who guides Scarlett's crew toward their goal, and Perseus (Andrew Morgado), the demigod son of Zeus who became a zombie warlord after failing a trial.

The Aether story of Zombies mode continues the story from Black Ops III, and follows the Primis crew: Edward Richtofen (Nolan North), "Tank" Dempsey (Steve Blum), Nikolai Belinski (Fred Tatasciore), and Takeo Masaki (Tom Kane), as they continue their mission of securing their souls from fractured timelines at the behest of Doctor Monty, an omnipotent being who resides in the Agartha dimension. Along their journey, Primis teams up with their original incarnation, known as Ultimis, while also receiving assistance from Victis, a group of survivors who previously interacted with Richtofen: Abigail "Misty" Briarton (Stephanie Lemelin), Marlton Johnson (Scott Menville), Samuel Stuhlinger (David Boat) and Russman (Keith Szarabajka). Other characters include: the Shadowman (Robert Picardo), leader of the Apothicon race who opposes Monty and the Order of the Keepers; the Warden of Alcatraz Penitentiary (Tom Kane), who subjected himself to becoming the Shadowman's servant and is tasked with imprisoning Primis; Doctor Ludvig Maxis (Fred Tatasciore), an ally of Primis from Dimension 63 who attempts to contact them occasionally from Agartha; Samantha Maxis (Julie Nathanson), Ludvig's daughter from the original dimension who now also resides in Agartha as a cleansed soul; Eddie, the cleansed soul of Richtofen from Dimension 2210 who now resides in Agartha in the form of a child; Rushmore (John de Lancie), an artificial intelligence operating the systems of Camp Edward, a Broken Arrow facility; Cornelius Pernell, Broken Arrow's Director who was transformed into a pure electric being following an experiment; and Pablo Marinus, a Mexican test subject of Group 935 who lives in their Siberian outpost as a hermit.

=== Plot ===
==== Multiplayer/Blackout ====
In 2043, during a covert mission involving a mercenary group, US Army Specialist Jessica Mason-Green is presumably killed in action while her squad mates, Donnie "Ruin" Walsh and Erin "Battery" Baker, escape with critical injuries. Two years later, Savannah Mason-Meyer, a trillionaire researcher and Jessica's sister, recruits ten of the world's most elite soldiers, including Ruin and Battery, for a top-secret project against an unknown threat. Savannah uses a Combat Immersion program to train the Specialists in a virtual simulation, with Sergeant Frank Woods acting as their instructor.

While taking a break from training, Ruin discusses with Battery about their survival two years prior, and that he received a warning message from a mysterious individual. At some point, the individual contacts Ruin at his home, tipping him off to an ambush by mercenaries. Ruin survives the ordeal, and arrives at a warehouse where he confronts the individual, revealed to be Jessica who remained alive and went undercover. It is implied that Savannah intends to eliminate all the Specialists she hired, and that she was somehow responsible for the botched mission in 2043. Woods is then shown in an asylum, standing beside a wheelchair-using Alex Mason. As Mason mutters to himself, Woods tells him that it has always been him "in the box".

Intel files unlocked from completing Specialist tutorial missions reveal additional stories. Savannah is revealed to be running Project Blackout, an experiment that is implied to be about resurrection of the dead through unknown means. The project was successful in reviving four subjects, referred to as "archetypes": Mason, Woods, Viktor Reznov, and Raul Menendez; the latter is tasked with overseeing the project alongside Savannah. Jessica, who disapproves of Savannah's actions, was revealed to have been actually shot by Savannah during a heated argument between the two sisters. Battery is revealed to have been seeing flashes of numbers, an effect of the brainwashing technique that Mason previously experienced during the Cold War, (Note: As depicted in Call of Duty: Black Ops) further hinting that the event of the mission in 2043 may not have been real. Woods, who is involved in a relationship with Savannah, is tasked with brainwashing Mason, using the same technique from before, for an unknown purpose. The latter was then allowed to meet Reznov, who Woods claims to have survived the events of Vorkuta.

==== Zombies (Chaos Story) ====
No.	Title	Original release date
1	"Voyage of Despair"	October 12, 2018
On April 14, 1912, Scarlett Rhodes, Bruno Delacroix, Diego Necalli, and Stanton Shaw, board the RMS Titanic in search of a mysterious device called the "Sentinel Artifact." They successfully acquire the artifact, but it is stolen by a member of an ancient cult called the Order, who releases a substance from within the artifact called "Prima Materia", which transforms the ship's passengers and crew into zombies. Just as the ship crashes with an iceberg, the four work together in order to recover the Sentinel Artifact and restore it. In doing so, they activate an ancient trial, which tests them with various puzzles and tasks. Upon successful completion of the trial, the Prima Materia's effect is reversed, and all passengers on the Titanic are reverted to their human state. The crew discovers an apparition of a gateway, but before they could interact with it, they are forced to escape as the ship sinks. Shaw points the crew toward their next destination, Delphi, Greece in order to find answers. Unbeknownst to the crew, Bruno possesses the same marking that the Order cultist had, hinting at his potential betrayal.
2	"IX"	October 12, 2018
Scarlett and the gang are guided by the Oracle of Delphi to an ancient cavern where the gateway is located. After inhaling a mysterious vapor, they begin to hallucinate and are taken back in time to an Gladiatorial Arena in Roman Egypt, where the High Priest of Chaos uses a Sentinel Artifact to turn slaves into zombies and pit them against gladiators for entertainment. The crew, now taking on the form of gladiators, is forced to fight for survival, as they complete various challenges to appease the four Gods: Danu, Ra, Zeus and Odin. Upon completion of the challenges, they face off against a combined force of undead warriors in the arena, and emerge victorious. The completion of the trial opens a portal to the Library of the Nine, but the High Priest fails to access it. He then has Scarlett and the rest executed despite their demand for clemency.
3	"Dead of the Night"	December 11, 2018
In a flashback to March 20, 1912, Scarlett's father and treasure hunter, Alistair Rhodes, hosts a party at his mansion in England, where many of his associates are invited. However, the Order, who has been after Alistair for some time, kidnaps him by enslaving his butler, Godfrey to do their bidding. Using a Sentinel Artifact, the Order transforms all of the guests in the mansion into zombies, sparing only Godfrey and three other guests: Gideon Jones, Christina Fowler, and Jonathan Warwick. The four band together to battle against the combined forces of undead, werewolves and vampires roaming the mansion. After successfully completing the trial, the four put an end to the undead outbreak, but Godfrey, under the influence of his dark self, murders the other three and inadvertently sets the mansion on fire. He is then killed by Scarlett, who gives chase to her father's kidnappers. She fails to rescue Alistair, but finds a letter he left behind, instructing her to seek out three of his most trusted associates: Bruno Delacroix, Diego Necalli, and Stanton Shaw.
4	"Ancient Evil"	March 26, 2019
Snapping out of the hallucination, Scarlett inputs the symbols she saw on the portal into the gateway, allowing the crew to enter the Ancient City of Delphi. They meet up with the Oracle, who has been trapped here for centuries amidst an ongoing Sentinel Trial. Hoping to prevent the ancient demigod Perseus from slaying the Olympian Gods, she assists them in fighting against the zombie horde roaming the city, as well as various ancient mythical Greek creatures. In the midst of the trial, Bruno's dark self takes over temporarily and secretly kills Shaw, then revives him using the Scepter of Ra, allowing Shaw to also be enslaved by his dark self. The trial reaches its culmination as the crew battles against Perseus and his winged steed Pegasus, and triumphs. While Scarlett attempts to free the Oracle, the other three follow her directions to look for Alistair, only to find that he and other Order members have been petrified. Diego runs back in horror, and discovers that the Oracle was Medusa in disguise. Medusa renders Scarlett unconscious after acquiring certain knowledge from her mind. Diego manages to retrieve Scarlett and hides, as Medusa declares her eventual ownership of the Library, and world domination.

==== Zombies (Aether Story) ====
No.	Title	Original release date
1	"Blood of the Dead"	October 12, 2018
During their mission to secure their own souls, the Primis crew takes a detour to Alcatraz Island, where Edward Richtofen plans to acquire blood vials, items he deems necessary for his "insurance policy", to protect his companions. Upon encountering a past version of himself, Richtofen is given the Kronorium book which details the history of past and future events, and learns that the contents of the book have changed, and that his own blood is now demanded by the prison's Warden. Through their attempt to survive his wrath, Primis learns that the Warden, working for the ancient Apothicon race via the Shadowman, intends to use Richtofen's blood to power a special machine called the Dark Mechanism, due to it containing a massive amount of Aether energy. After gaining the trust of the various spirits residing in the prison, Primis engages in a final showdown against the Warden and his zombie hordes, aided by the spirits of Alcatraz. Richtofen eventually enters the Dark Mechanism and willingly lets it extract his blood, hoping for a chance at defeating the Warden. This in turn releases another Richtofen, who has lived through a previous cycle of the events, (Note: As depicted in Call of Duty: Black Ops III) and kept himself cryogenically frozen under Alcatraz for years. Using the fire elemental gem from the ancient Staff of Fire, the newly awakened Richtofen greatly weakens the Warden, allowing Primis to defeat him and free all souls in Alcatraz from their torment. Having broken the cycle, Richtofen hands the Kronorium to Nikolai Belinski and passes over the leadership mantle, convincing the latter that his soul is needed to defeat the omnipotent Doctor Monty. The new cycle's Richtofen is left to die as his blood is drained by the Dark Mechanism.
2	"Classified"	October 12, 2018
Back in the original timeline, following their adventures at Shangri-La, the Ultimis crew attempts to teleport to the Moon immediately, but instead ends up in The Pentagon in 1963. Meanwhile, at the Ascension Facility in Russia, the scientist Yuri Zavoyski tricks his partner Gersh into activating a black hole device, sucking him in it, per the orders of a corrupted Samantha Maxis. Yuri uses the device to travel to the Pentagon and unleash the zombie horde, experimented on by the US Government, against Ultimis. The four battle against the undead across the Pentagon, as well as the Groom Lake facility of Area 51. Unbeknownst to them, a future version of Ultimis, following the destruction of the Earth in 2025, time-traveled back to Groom Lake months before the arrival of their past selves. Richtofen, whose body was occupied by Samantha's soul from the future, went into a comatose state when her soul was sucked out; however, he was revived when a zombified Richtofen arrived some times later and interacted with his comatose self, transferring his consciousness to the new body. As the future Ultimis remains in captive at Groom Lake, Primis arrives and convinces them to leave together in preparation for "the great war".
3	"Alpha Omega"	July 9, 2019
Primis and Ultimis travel together to Camp Edward, a nuclear testing facility run by the American research group Broken Arrow, in search of an Elemental Shard. They activate the facility's artificial intelligence, codenamed Rushmore, who agrees to give them the shard in exchange for them proving their worthiness. After completing several tasks and demonstrating the core values of Broken Arrow, Rushmore then proceeds to open the APD (American Pyramid Device), which houses Broken Arrow's Director, Cornelius Pernell, who has been transformed into an electric being following an experiment with the shard. Dubbing himself "Avogadro", Pernell then battles Primis and Ultimis, but ultimately fails and is teleported to a different Broken Arrow facility in Hanford, Washington. (Note: As depicted in Call of Duty: Black Ops II) The crews retrieve the elemental shard, but then learn from Doctor Ludvig Maxis, who has been residing in Agartha, that Monty is aware of their plan. Maxis reveals that Monty would be able to wipe out the Apothicons and the presence of Element 115, but at the cost of his own life; thus, he intends to perpetuate the cycle. As he attempts to send Samantha and Eddie to safety, Monty reveals his true form and devours Maxis. Samantha arrives at Camp Edward, regaining her Aether powers once more, and swears vengeance on Monty.
4	"Tag der Toten"	September 23, 2019
Primis and Ultimis take a temporary break in a forest, and celebrate before their final battle. Back in Alcatraz, the cryopods in Richtofen's lab open, releasing the Victis crew from their slumber. Ultimis Richtofen, as well as Primis Nikolai, instructs Victis to go to the Group 935 outpost in Siberia to construct an "Agarthan Device", said to be capable of granting its user any wish they desire. At the Siberian outpost, Victis encounters Pablo Marinus, one of Richtofen's former test subjects who was assumed to have died, and receives his help in constructing the device, using the blood of an ancient Apothicon being, a container dubbed the Seal of Duality, and the Elemental Shard. After fully powering up the device, Pablo uses it to travel to the Great War, where he would assist Primis Richtofen in sending him back to Alcatraz and break the cycle. The Agarthan Device is then sent to Primis Nikolai, who uses it to destroy the Summoning Key. Nikolai reveals the truth that the Kronorium showed him: despite their best efforts, they would be doomed to repeat the cycle if they ever participate in the Great War. He also reveals that he and the rest of Primis/Ultimis are the catalysts that perpetuate the cycle, and as long as any of them exist, it will allow Monty to keep the cycle going, ensuring the survival of both the universe and himself. As a result, Nikolai has both crews killed by poisoning their drinks, then asks Samantha to kill him. The destruction of the Summoning Key also ensures the entire multiverse, including Monty, the Apothicons and Element 115, are banished to the Dark Aether. As Samantha and Eddie walk toward a light in the darkness, each member of Primis and Ultimis can be heard in the background revealing their desires for a life after the war.

== Development ==
According to a report from Kotaku editor Jason Schreier, Treyarch originally planned for Black Ops 4 to have a campaign, titled "Career", continuing from the story of Call of Duty: Black Ops III (2015). It would have been set in a 2070s post-apocalyptic world where four players could progress through the story, split into teams of two (with an option for solo players to play with AI bots). However, in early 2018, the team decided to cancel the campaign mode due to technical concerns, timing, and negative playtesting feedback. Combined with publisher Activision's decision to release the game in October, the team resorted to creating the Blackout battle royale mode as a replacement for the traditional campaign.

In August 2022, assets and details of the Career mode were leaked online, revealing further details of the story which featured two major opposing factions, the World United Nations and the Free People's Army. Gameplay would include PVP and PVE sections, abilities similar to those from Black Ops III, side-objectives, and companion characters based on the same game's multiplayer specialists.

== Marketing ==
On February 6, 2018, Eurogamer indicated that Treyarch's 2018 Call of Duty title would be a new entry in the Black Ops sub-series, following Black Ops III. On March 5, Call of Duty news site Charlie Intel received images of gaming retailer GameStop's internal database that showed listings for items that were meant to market Call of Duty: Black Ops 4.

The insignia for Black Ops 4, which unconventionally features Roman numerals in a basic decimal pattern

On March 7, 2018, NBA player James Harden was seen prior to playing a basketball game wearing a hat bearing an orange logo. People pointed out the similarities between this logo and previous ones for Black Ops titles, which both featured Roman numerals colored orange. Harden later confirmed that this was indeed advertising for Black Ops 4. On March 8, the game was formally announced by Activision and a teaser trailer released for it; a reveal event was held on May 17, 2018.

=== Release ===
Call of Duty: Black Ops 4 was released on October 12, 2018, on PlayStation 4, Windows, and Xbox One. It is the first Call of Duty title to be released in October since Call of Duty 2; titles since then have all been released in November. The release of Call of Duty: Black Ops 4 a month earlier was thought to be due to Rockstar Games's much anticipated release of Red Dead Redemption 2 on October 26. The Windows version exclusively uses Blizzard Entertainment's Battle.net platform, and will not use or be available on Steam for the first time since 2005's Call of Duty 2 (which got a Steam release later).

Like previous titles, a private beta for the multiplayer mode was offered to players who pre-ordered the game. On July 11, 2018, Activision and Treyarch announced the dates for the multiplayer beta: PlayStation 4 players had an exclusive first beta weekend from August 3 to 6, while a second weekend from August 10 to 13 was offered to all platforms. The Windows platform received an open beta for all players from August 11 to 13, while players who pre-ordered the game could play from August 10. Activision also announced a beta for the Blackout mode, which took place from September 10 for PlayStation 4, September 14 for Xbox One and Windows, and ending September 17 for all platforms. Like the multiplayer beta, the Windows platforms also had an open beta for Blackout which began September 15.

=== Special editions and downloadable contents ===
On June 11, 2018, Activision and Treyarch announced three special editions available for Black Ops 4: the Digital Deluxe, the Digital Deluxe Enhanced, and the Pro Edition. All three editions contain the Black Ops Pass, a special season pass that grants access to "Classified", a bonus Zombies map available at launch, in addition to four more maps to be released in 2019, as well as twelve multiplayer maps, and four exclusive characters for use in Blackout mode. Rather than distributing new maps via map packs like previous Call of Duty titles, the Black Ops Pass will deliver new content on a more frequent basis throughout the year. Players who pre-order any digital editions of the game on PlayStation 4 also receive the "Back in Black" map pack for Call of Duty: Black Ops III. The pack contains four remastered multiplayer maps: Jungle, Summit, Slums, and Firing Range (all of which are included in Black Ops 4 at launch). A collector's edition titled "Mystery Box Edition" was also announced, which contains various Zombies-themed physical items, such as a collectible Mystery Box based on the mechanic of the same name in-game, lithographs based on the three on-disc Zombies maps, and figure pins based on the four main characters of the Zombies Chaos story. A Windows-only edition containing Multiplayer and Blackout modes called the "Battle Edition" was released on December 6, 2018.

On September 20, 2018, Activision and Sony revealed their partnership for Black Ops 4, which allows the PlayStation 4 version of the game to receive all content updates, including free and paid content, seven days before other platforms, as opposed to the 30-day gap that was present in previous Call of Duty titles.

As opposed to the traditional downloadable content model of four map packs, Black Ops 4 receives frequent updates in the form of "Operations", which are themed events across all game modes, featuring a variety of free and paid limited-time content for the game, as well as the Black Ops Pass content. Following the reveal of the game's third Operation, Grand Heist, Treyarch and Activision announced their plans to feature six Operations in the game for 2019. The game features a tiered loot system called "Black Market Contraband", in which players can earn progress in tiers to earn cosmetic items by playing Multiplayer and Blackout within the duration of an Operation. The Black Market, the in-game virtual store, also features exclusive cosmetic items only purchaseable with "COD Points", a microtransaction currency. COD Points can also be used to trade for Nebulium Plasma, a currency used to craft and receive random Elixirs and Talismans in the Zombies mode. Following an update in February, the game reintroduced purchaseable lootboxes called "Reserve Crates", which contain additional cosmetic items beyond the Contraband stream.

=== Comics tie-in ===
On June 20, 2018, Dark Horse Comics revealed that they would be publishing the second season of the Call of Duty: Zombies comic book series, which was first launched in October 2016. The second season, which is a prequel focusing on the four new characters of the Chaos story, released its first issue on September 5, 2018, with 3 additional issues to follow. Treyarch's Co-Studio Head Jason Blundell and Lead Writer Craig Houston are once again behind the story of the series, and Justin Jordan and Dan Jackson return as writer and colorist, respectively, while Andres Ponce and Mauro Vargas join the series as penciller and inker, respectively. The cover art for each issue is drawn by E. M. Gist.

On September 26, 2018, Activision announced a new 10-issue comic series featuring the Multiplayer Specialist characters, released for free on the official Call of Duty website. The series serves as a prequel to the game, with each issue introducing a Specialist and their background prior to the events of the game.

== Reception ==
=== Pre-release ===
Upon rumors emerging that Black Ops 4 would not have a single-player campaign mode, reactions from the Call of Duty community were negative. The official confirmation by Treyarch of the absence of a campaign led to many fans expressing their disappointment. In response to the criticism, Dan Bunting, studio co-head at Treyarch, stated in an interview with Eurogamer that "We are delivering so much more of what players spend most of their time doing in our games in the series", implying that fewer fans took their time to play the single-player than the multiplayer. In an interview with Polygon in May 2018, Bunting later claimed that a traditional campaign for the game had never been intended, and appeared to repudiate earlier reports that Treyarch had scrapped work on it due to time constraints.

=== Post-release ===
Reception

Aggregate score
Aggregator	Score
Metacritic	(PC) 82/100 (PS4) 83/100 (XONE) 85/100

Review scores
Publication	Score
Electronic Gaming Monthly	8.5/10
Game Informer	9.5/10
GameSpot	8/10
IGN	8.5/10
The Telegraph	5/5

Call of Duty: Black Ops 4 received "generally favorable" reviews across all platforms according to review aggregator Metacritic. In its 9.5/10 review, Game Informer wrote: "Call of Duty: Black Ops 4 makes a sacrifice that's sure to be off-putting to some with the lack of a campaign, but the surrender of tradition comes with sweeping and significant benefits. Blackout is the best battle-royale experience available today, zombies offers crazy customizable co-op, and multiplayer keeps things grounded for those looking for the classic core." Electronic Gaming Monthly gave the game 8.5/10, writing: "Call of Duty: Black Ops 4 has made some bold changes to the series, and ultimately, they're for the better. The inclusion of a battle royale mode is a first, and even the more familiar multiplayer and Zombies survival mode are not what they once were. Changes are always risky, but in Black Ops 4's case, it worked out for the better." IGN wrote that "Black Ops 4 has a few rough edges, but any of its three modes make for an enjoyable shooter experience that feel distinct and personalized." It gave separate reviews for each mode with Blackout receiving then highest at 9/10, Zombies with 8.5/10, and the Multiplayer with 7.8/10. The whole game was given a score of 8.5/10.

=== Retrospective reviews ===
Retrospective assessments of Call of Duty: Black Ops 4 have been mixed. Whereas some publications rank it among the series' top 10 games, others, such as NME, place it among the series' worst. Complex's Dan Wenerowicz argued that it represents the end of an era for Call of Duty, being the final game in the series before its "Warzone era". Despite lacking a single-player campaign, Seth Parmer of TheGamer argues that Black Ops 4 stands among the series' most "beloved" titles.

Some publications have praised the multiplayer mode as one of the series' finest iterations, whereas others have criticised it for feeling too similar to Black Ops III's multiplayer. Cade Onder of ComicBook.com argued the mode veered too far away from the series' formula, resulting in an experience that felt like less Call of Duty. Blackout was also received positively as a battle royale mode, although Chris Freiberg of Den of Geek found it inferior to Fortnite and PUBG: Battlegrounds, and its successor Warzone. Blackout also failed to achieve the same success as Warzone, released in 2020, due to being paywalled to Black Ops 4. The Zombies mode received praise as an "excellent" iteration that "offered up a deep, memorable experience full of secrets to uncover as you lay waste to hordes of the undead".

=== Microtransactions ===
In June 2018, following the reveal of the game's season pass, Activision and Treyarch received heavy backlash from the community for the downloadable content program as it was confirmed that map packs could not be bought separately from the pass. Players and critics compared the release model unfavorably to other companies' approach toward free content, such as Electronic Arts with Battlefield V, criticizing Activision for focusing on the monetization of downloadable content and microtransactions, and splitting the game's community.

Several weeks after Black Ops 4's release, a microtransaction system allowing for the purchase of cosmetic items which provided no gameplay advantages was incorporated into the game, drawing criticism for being overpriced while offering few benefits in return. Forbes' Erik Kain called the cosmetics system as "[falling] short to various degrees." He criticized that progression in the game's Black Market Contraband, allowing the player to advance through tiers and unlock items, was "far too slow" and encouraged real-world money to speed up progress; Special Orders (cosmetic item bundles) not only required real money, but also subsequent hours of grinding to unlock said items; and that the Black Market shop's biggest drawback was that the cosmetic skins were "hot, steaming garbage". In summary, he condemned Activision for being "far, far too greedy at this point". Despite this, in another article, Kain felt the microtransactions did not ruin his overall enjoyment of the game, which remained "very fun, very polished ... a well-balanced first-person shooter." Wesley Yin-Poole of Eurogamer also felt that the game presented a "soul-destroying" grind for players looking to unlock desired items through hours of playtime, inciting them to pay for microtransactions instead and unlock the content sooner.

In February 2019, the game received further criticism when Treyarch implemented the use of loot boxes into the microtransactions system. Yin-Poole noted how many fans were disgruntled at their design, as they did not note the probability of obtaining an item and also contained duplicates of things a player may already have gained. He lamented that it felt the "fantastic" core game was buckling under pressure to generate more money for Activision, citing its additional season pass, Black Market Contraband, and paid-for cosmetics, and called the overall design "convoluted, confused and inescapably money-grabbing". Kain echoed these complaints, further criticizing the cost of loot boxes and only being available by paying real-world funds, saying "There are so many ways you can spend your money in Black Ops 4 at this point, it's just ridiculous." He attributed their inclusion to the game underperforming in sales for Activision. As a result of the loot boxes, some fans also accused developer Treyarch's design chief David Vonderhaar of lying as he had initially stated that unlocking Blackout characters could not be achieved through microtransactions. Vonderhaar responded by saying "I can tell you what we have done and what we plan on doing, but things change that I can not predict or I didn't know about. Doubly true with the business side of things which I have little insight into and even less control over ... I answer the questions as best I can with the information I have at the time I am asked."

=== Sales ===
Black Ops 4 grossed over $500 million in worldwide sales within its first three days of release. Despite being the best-selling digital launch in Activision's history, overall physical retail sales were down 50% from Call of Duty: WWII (2017), making it the lowest in the series in a decade. The game's lack of a single-player campaign did not hinder overall sales.

The game was the top selling title of October 2018 in the US. It became the second best selling title in November and December 2018, behind Red Dead Redemption 2, and Super Smash Bros. Ultimate. Despite Black Ops 4 becoming the second best-selling title of 2018, Activision announced in February 2019 that the game did not meet their sales expectations. After the backlash from fans over the lack of a campaign, Activision announced the next day that the next Call of Duty title would include a single-player campaign.

=== Accolades ===
Year	Award	Category	Result	Ref.
2018	Game Critics Awards	Best Action Game	Nominated	
2018	Game Critics Awards	Best Online Multiplayer	Nominated	
2018	Gamescom 2018	Best Social/Online Game	Won	
2018	Golden Joystick Awards	Ultimate Game of the Year	Nominated	
2018	The Game Awards 2018	Best Audio Design	Nominated	
2018	The Game Awards 2018	Best Action Game	Nominated	
2018	The Game Awards 2018	Best Multiplayer Game	Nominated	
2018	Gamers' Choice Awards	Fan Favorite Game	Nominated	
2018	Gamers' Choice Awards	Fan Favorite Multiplayer Game	Nominated	
2018	Gamers' Choice Awards	Fan Favorite Shooter Game	Won	
2018	Gamers' Choice Awards	Fan Favorite Battle Royale Game (Blackout)	Nominated	
2018	Titanium Awards	Best Action Game	Nominated	
2018	Australian Games Awards	Multiplayer/Online Title of the Year	Nominated	
2018	Australian Games Awards	Shooter of the Year	Won	
2018	Australian Games Awards	Game of the Year	Nominated	
2019	22nd Annual D.I.C.E. Awards	Action Game of the Year	Nominated	
2019	NAVGTR Awards	Game, eSports	Nominated	
2019	2019 G.A.N.G. Awards	Best Original Song ("Right Where We Belong")	Nominated	
2019	Italian Video Game Awards	People's Choice	Nominated	
2019	Golden Joystick Awards	eSports Game of the Year	Nominated	
