= Call of Duty: Black Ops III =

2015 first-person shooter video game

- Developer: Treyarch
- Publisher: Activision
- Directors: Jason Blundell; Dan Bunting
- Designer: David Vonderhaar
- Artist: Colin Whitney
- Writers: Jason Blundell; Craig Houston
- Composer: Jack Wall
- Series: Call of Duty
- Engine: IW (modified)
- Platforms: PlayStation 3; PlayStation 4; Windows; Xbox 360; Xbox One; macOS
- Release: PS3, PS4, Win, X360, XONE November 6, 2015; macOS April 4, 2019
- Genre: First-person shooter
- Modes: Single-player, multiplayer (Note: The PlayStation 3 and Xbox 360 versions of the game are multiplayer only.)

Call of Duty: Black Ops III is a 2015 first-person shooter game developed by Treyarch and published by Activision. It is the twelfth entry in the Call of Duty series and the sequel to the 2012 video game Call of Duty: Black Ops II. It was released on PlayStation 4, Windows, and Xbox One on November 6, 2015. A feature-limited version developed by Beenox and Mercenary Technology that only supports multiplayer modes was released on PlayStation 3 and Xbox 360 and was also the final Call of Duty title released on those platforms.

Black Ops III is set in 2065, 40 years after the events of Black Ops II, in a world shaped by the impacts of climate change and the rise of advanced technologies, including cybernetic enhancements. Similar to its predecessors, the story follows a group of black ops soldiers. The game's campaign is designed to support 4-player cooperative gameplay, allowing for bigger, more open level design and less corridor shooting. As the player character is cybernetically enhanced, players have access to various special activities. The game also features a standalone Zombies campaign mode, and a "Nightmares" mode, which replaces all enemies as zombies.

Announced in late April 2015, the game is the first Call of Duty video game released after Activision ended its partnership with Microsoft Studios and instead partnered with Sony Computer Entertainment, which secured the timed exclusivity of the game's downloadable content. Upon release, the game received generally positive reviews from critics, praising the gameplay, zombies mode, and amount of content. However, it was also criticized for its story and lack of innovation. The seventh-generation console versions, in particular, were singled out for their performance issues and lack of features. Retrospective reviews have been mixed, with the game generally placing below the top 10 in lists ranking the series' games. It was a commercial success, becoming the top-selling retail game in the US in 2015, and one of the most successful titles released for the eighth generation of video game consoles, selling over 43 million copies worldwide since release. A prequel, Call of Duty: Black Ops 4, released in 2018.

== Gameplay ==
The campaign in Black Ops III is designed to support 4-player cooperative gameplay, allowing for bigger, more open and free level design and less corridor shooting. In addition, the player can customize their character's appearance and clothing. The campaign features its own progression system, featuring unlock tokens which must be used to acquire different weapons and gears as they progress through the campaign. The game features a "realistic" difficulty mode, in which players will get defeated if they are hit by one bullet. Finishing all campaign missions will also unlock "Nightmares" mode, where players can replay the entire campaign with a new narrative, as well as zombies replacing most of the normal enemies.

The multiplayer mode introduces a new momentum based movement system, which utilizes thruster packs to allow players to perform slow boosts into the air, as well as perform wall running and sliding, all the while giving players complete gun control. In addition to the Pick 10 class system from Black Ops II, Treyarch implemented a character system called "Specialists", where players can pick from 9 different soldiers, each with either a special weapon or ability unique to them. In a later update, a tenth specialist named Blackjack was added to the game. Blackjack is able to mimic the abilities of other specialists, and is only playable for a short amount of time upon completing a set of challenges. A new "Gunsmith" feature offers aesthetic variations in weapon attachments, allowing various weapon customization combinations. The Paintshop feature allows players to create their own custom prints onto specific portions of a gun, further emphasizing the depth of customization in the game.

The Zombies mode features a new XP progression system, which allows players to unlock items in a similar fashion to multiplayer and campaign. Unlockable items include "Gobblegums", which grant players with temporary bonuses, and weapon kits that allow players to modify the appearance and attributes of the guns with various camos and attachments.

Black Ops III features several bonus game modes in addition to the three main offerings: Nightmares, an alternate retelling of the campaign that incorporates zombies; Dead Ops Arcade, a top-down shooter mode that acts as a sequel to the original iteration from Call of Duty: Black Ops, and Freerun, a parkour-inspired game mode where players utilize advanced movement mechanics to navigate the levels and reach the goal.

== Plot ==
=== Campaign ===
Forty years after the events of Call of Duty: Black Ops II, the world is in the midst of a Third Cold War between the Winslow Accord (WA) and the Common Defense Pact (CDP). On October 27, 2065, the Player (Ben Browder/Abby Brammell) (Note: The customizable player character is voiced by Ben Browder if male and Abby Brammel if female.) and their partner Jacob Hendricks (Sean Douglas) of WA Black Ops are deployed to Ethiopia to rescue the Egyptian Prime Minister and other hostages from the CDP-aligned Nile River Coalition (NRC). The extraction goes awry, leaving the Player critically wounded by a combat robot. Rescued by fellow operative John Taylor (Christopher Meloni), the Player undergoes emergency cybernetic surgery, including a direct neural interface (DNI), and receives virtual training from Taylor and his teammates Sebastian Diaz (Reynaldo Gallegos), Sarah Hall (Katee Sackhoff), and Peter Maretti (Ary Katz); Hendricks also volunteers for surgery.

After five years of wetwork, the Player and Hendricks are assigned to CIA handler Rachel Kane (Rachel Kimsey) to investigate a CIA black site in Singapore. They find it attacked by the crime syndicate 54 Immortals, and the site's data stolen, leading Kane to conclude Taylor's team defected and murdered the staff. To locate the data, the Player and Hendricks disguise as arms dealers to meet the Immortals, but their cover is blown, resulting in the death of the Immortals' leader Goh Min. They recover data pointing to Taylor's last known location at a Coalescence Corporation facility in Singapore, destroyed ten years earlier in a deadly explosion. At the facility, they find a hidden CIA laboratory and discover Diaz leaking classified intel to the CDP, and they are forced to kill him. Diaz's DNI reveals Taylor's goal is to find the two survivors of the explosion: CEO Sebastian Krueger (Robert Picardo) and Dr. Yousef Salim (Tony Amendola). When the leaked intel leads to Kane's capture by the Immortals, the Player defies orders to leave her behind and rescues her by killing Goh Min's sister, Xiulan (Lynn Chen).

The trio travels to Cairo and finds Salim, who reveals he conducted illegal DNI experiments involving calming humans through imagining a frozen forest. The NRC then invades, allowing Taylor's team to abduct Salim, who is tortured and executed by Taylor. The trio pursues Taylor with the Egyptian Army's help, but faces resistance from Hall. After killing Hall, the Player connects to her DNI and encounters Corvus, a gestalt intelligence manifested during the experiments to monitor DNI users' thoughts. Corvus malfunctioned, causing the explosion and later infecting Taylor's team. Corvus' obsession with finding the forest spread to the Player and Hendricks after they interfaced with Hall and Diaz respectively. After killing Maretti, the duo spark an uprising against the NRC, using the chaos to locate and corner Taylor. Taylor manages to resist Corvus and pulls out his DNI, but is killed by Hendricks, who abandons the Player to pursue Krueger.

The Player and Kane race to Coalescence's headquarters in Zürich to stop Hendricks, but discover Corvus is storing Nova 6 gas, previously used in the Singapore explosion. Kane tries to contain it but is locked in a room, and the gas is leaked, killing her in front of the Player. The Player finds Hendricks holding Krueger hostage; after Hendricks kills Krueger, the Player kills him in turn. The Player attempts to commit suicide to stop Corvus but is trapped in a simulated frozen forest created by Corvus as an afterlife for deceased DNI users. As a glitch, Taylor's consciousness reunites with the Player, advising they must purge their DNI to end Corvus. With Taylor's help, the Player resists Corvus and deletes the virus, then escapes and identifies as "Taylor" to Zürich Security Forces.

Taylor's mission reports reveal that the Player actually died during their surgery due to complications. The events that follow until Taylor's death occur in a simulation that diverges from Taylor's and Hendricks's experience of hunting down Dylan Stone and his team (Javier Ramirez, Alice Conrad, and Joseph Fierro), who defected after discovering the black site. The Player's consciousness is shown living in Taylor's mind throughout the simulation, indicating that the Player took over Taylor's body after his simulated death until the DNI purge results in Corvus and the Player being erased as Taylor regains control.

=== Nightmares ===
The Player (Note: Unlike the campaign, the player character is locked into a female perspective.) wakes up only to be told by Dr. Salim that they are dead, and that the Player must recount their memories. The Player tells Dr. Salim that they are a Deadkiller, an Undead Exterminator whose cybernetic augments make them immune to Zombie infection. The year is 2070, ten years after Virus 61-15, a CIA weapon combining biochemicals Nova 6 and Element 115, spread across the Earth and caused the dead to rise as Zombies and create mutated creatures known as Parasites. The Player was sent to investigate the disappearance of Taylor's Deadkiller team at a facility in Singapore, which was the initial outbreak point of the virus. However, upon investigating, the Player and Hendricks discover that Taylor's team has used their DNI connections to disable the Quarantine Zone defenses all over the world. Teaming up with Rachel Kane, the Player and Hendricks chase Taylor's team all from Singapore to Egypt, eventually being forced to kill the entire team. However, Hendricks is infected by the same virus that turned Taylor and his team mad, and heads for Zurich. The Player discovers that Dr. Salim is in fact Deimos, the demigod responsible for unleashing the undead plague on humanity. Deimos had entered the Player's mind when they interfaced with Hall, and attempts to manipulate them into opening a portal to his home dimension, Malus. The Player is then contacted by another demigod, Dolos, who is sympathetic to humanity and seeks to kill Deimos, her brother. Dolos transports both the Player and Deimos to Malus, where Deimos is vulnerable. Under Dolos' guidance, the Player kills Deimos, ending the undead plague on Earth, but trapping the Player in Malus. Dolos then explains to the Player that her true plans are to kill every other demigod and supernatural being that can challenge her, and the Player agrees to help her.

=== Zombies ===
No.	Title	Original release date
1	"Shadows of Evil"	November 6, 2015
In Morg City, 1944, the Apothicons, an interdimensional species corrupted and mutated by the Aether's dark energy, manipulate four individuals: burlesque dancer Jessica Rose (Heather Graham), corrupt cop Jack Vincent (Neal McDonough), up-and-coming boxer Floyd Campbell (Ron Perlman), and failing magician Nero Blackstone (Jeff Goldblum). Deceived by the Shadowman (Robert Picardo), leader of the Apothicons, they open a rift using an artifact known as the Summoning Key, freeing an ancient Apothicon beast. With the aid of the Keepers, a mysterious otherworldly order guarding the Key, the four trap the Shadowman inside the Key and banish the beast from their dimension. However, before they can reclaim the Key from the Keepers, Edward Richtofen (Nolan North) steals the Key and exits through a portal, leaving the four and the rest of Dimension 63 to be doomed by the Apothicons.
2	"The Giant"	November 6, 2015
Following the battle in Northern France, 1918, (Note: As depicted in the Call of Duty: Black Ops II Zombies map "Origins" (2013)) the Dimension 63 variants of "Tank" Dempsey (Steve Blum), Nikolai Belinski (Fred Tatasciore), and Takeo Masaki (Tom Kane) continue to pursue Richtofen in his interdimensional journey, and arrive in the Der Riese facility in the original timeline, only moments after Doctor Ludvig Maxis (Fred Tatasciore) and his daughter Samantha were teleported away by the original Richtofen. The three attempt to convince this Richtofen to awaken their original selves, but are interrupted by the arrival of Dimension 63 Richtofen, who kills his original counterpart, triggering various timeline fractures. The four then band together to fend off the zombie horde; eventually, they activate a beacon within the facility, allowing Dimension 63 Maxis to locate them from the Agartha dimension.
3	"Der Eisendrache"	February 2, 2016
In pursuit of the original Dempsey, the crew travels to Der Eisendrache, Group 935's fortress in Austria. Despite Group 935 member Doctor Groph's attempt at preventing the group from retrieving the test subject, he ultimately fails and perishes when Richtofen overrides the castle's defense system and sends a barrage of missiles to destroy the Moon and Group 935's base on it. As the crew retrieves the original Dempsey, Richtofen reveals his plan to prevent their original incarnations from wreaking havoc upon the multiverse. Dimension 63 Dempsey then volunteers to kill his counterpart before allowing Richtofen to absorb his soul with the Summoning Key.
4	"Zetsubou No Shima"	April 19, 2016
The crew teleports to a new fractured timeline to locate the original Takeo, who is held prisoner at a Pacific island by the Japanese research group Division 9. They discover that Division 9 had been experimenting with plant life mutation using Element 115, with the original Takeo also a victim of the experimentation. After they manage to release him from the mutation, Dimension 63 Takeo learns that the Emperor of Japan betrayed his original self and sent him to this island out of petty jealousy. The original Takeo proceeds to commit seppuku, allowing the crew to absorb his soul with the Summoning Key. Afterwards, Richtofen takes the crew on a detour to Alcatraz Island, where they retrieve several blood vials, the purpose of which he refuses to explain at the time.
5	"Gorod Krovi"	July 12, 2016
The crew teleports to another fractured timeline and lands in a war-torn Stalingrad in 1945, where the Soviet Union has stolen Group 935's technology to create their own giant robots and mechanical soldiers, while Nazi Germany is aided by ancient dragons resurrected and bred by Division 9. As the crew traverses across the city, they are forced to help Sophia (Christa Lewis), Maxis' former assistant who has been transformed into a machine, to initiate the Ascension Protocol, allowing her to gain knowledge of interdimensional travel. Amidst the chaos, the original Nikolai, who has taken control of a modified drone unit, teams up with the group to destroy the alpha dragon. However, upon the dragon's death, Nikolai refuses to surrender, forcing the crew to take out his drone. The original Nikolai is angered by his Dimension 63 self as he mentions their deceased wife, and attempts to shoot him, only to be killed in retaliation. With all souls collected, Richtofen calls out to Maxis to summon a portal, and release the souls into it. Doctor Monty (Malcolm McDowell), an omnipotent being who has been observing the crew from Agartha, announces his existence to the crew and informs them of the state of the multiverse.
6	"Revelations"	September 6, 2016
The crew returns to Agartha and arrives in "The House", Monty’s safe haven for Samantha and the crew’s cleansed souls, who have been given child-like physical forms. After Monty seals the House from the rest of the multiverse, Maxis is manipulated by the Shadowman into releasing him from the Summoning Key. The Shadowman then uses his power to merge various other dimensions into Agartha, including the Dark Aether, unleashing the Apothicons. After helping Sophia enter Agartha, the crew retrieves the Summoning Key and an ancient book called the Kronorium, then they defeat the Shadowman with the combined power of the two artifacts. Maxis, residing within the Key, then absorbs the children's souls into the Key, and joins Sophia as they fly toward the Apothicon sun, banishing all Apothicon presences from Agartha. The crew is able to remain in the dimension without fading from existence, thanks to the blood vials they retrieved earlier. Monty, worried about the crew becoming a paradox in his perfect world, sends them to ancient medieval times, where they would be remembered as "Primis", heroes who aided the Keepers in sealing away the Apothicons in the Great War, effectively "completing the cycle" of the universe.

== Development ==
Call of Duty: Black Ops III is the twelfth game in the Call of Duty franchise, and the fourth entry in the Black Ops series. The game was the second to benefit under publisher Activision's three-year development cycle, the first being Call of Duty: Advanced Warfare. The cycle allows each of the development teams of the Call of Duty series (Infinity Ward, Treyarch, and Sledgehammer Games) to develop games in a three-year timespan, as opposed to the two allowed previously. Black Ops III uses a heavily modified version of the IW engine used previously in Black Ops II.

On June 9, 2015, versions for the PlayStation 3 and Xbox 360 were confirmed to be under development by Beenox and Mercenary Technology. These versions lack some features available on other platforms, such as the game's campaign mode and the remaining DLC contents. On June 15, 2015, it was announced that as part of a new exclusivity deal with Sony Computer Entertainment, all downloadable content for future Call of Duty games, beginning with Black Ops III, would be released first on PlayStation platforms as timed exclusives. This ends a similar exclusivity deal with Microsoft dating back to Call of Duty 4: Modern Warfare.

According to gaming journalist Jason Schreier, Call of Duty: Black Ops III was initially intended to include an open-world campaign, but was scrapped during development, resulting in a period of crunch for employees.

A multiplayer beta was released for the PlayStation 4 on August 18, 2015, and was released for Windows and the Xbox One on August 26, 2015. All versions of the multiplayer beta ran for six days.

In March 2026, Creative Director Jason Blundell stated that when the team regrouped during development of Black Ops III, they had around nine to ten months to make both the Campaign and Zombies modes, recalling that at the time the team "had nothing" and described the final result as "a miracle".

=== Music ===
Jack Wall, who previously composed the score for Call of Duty: Black Ops II, returned along with Treyarch's Audio Director Brian Tuey to compose the score for the game. The game also featured an instrumental score entitled "Jade Helm", provided by Avenged Sevenfold, for use in the multiplayer mode. Additionally, both Wall, Tuey and Treyarch's Sound Designer Kevin Sherwood contributed to the composition of the Zombies mode's soundtrack, including several new songs performed by Elena Siegman and Malukah for each of the maps.

To promote, the DJ and producer Afrojack did a song for the game, called "Unstoppable".

== Marketing ==
=== Reveal ===
Teasers were released beginning with Snapchat links appearing in the gameplay of Black Ops II as well as a teaser video released by Treyarch. On April 26, 2015, the first reveal trailer for the game was released and revealed the return of the Zombies mode and beta access for people that pre-order the game for the PC, PS4, and Xbox One. The full game was released on November 6, 2015.

=== Controversy ===
On September 29, 2015, the official Twitter account of Call of Duty was temporarily renamed to "Current Events Aggregate". It then began tweeting messages about real-life fashion, movies and a terrorist attack that takes place in Singapore. Activision later revealed that these tweets are fake, and served to promote the game's story campaign. This marketing campaign was strongly criticized for faking news, and publisher Activision was blamed for being "irresponsible". The game's director Jason Blundell said that the team was "shocked" by the negative reaction of the marketing campaign, and offered an apology.

=== Seize Glory ===
Seize Glory is an official live action trailer for Call of Duty: Black Ops 3 that was directed by Wayne McClammy and starring Michael B. Jordan, Cara Delevingne and Marshawn Lynch. The trailer features Michael B. Jordan following a man named Kevin as he runs through warfare while destroying zombies and robots. The trailer first aired during November 2015.

Activision hired Wayne McClammy as the director. Wayne has been the director of many Call of Duty advertisements. According to Activision Publishing CMO Tim Ellis, the trailer's intent was to show that “The gaming population is so much bigger and more diverse than people may think". Actors Michael B. Jordan and Cara Delevingne were chosen to star in the trailer as both were known by Activision to be fans of the Call of Duty series.

=== Pre-order ===
Call of Duty: Black Ops III and the Digital Deluxe Edition counterpart were available to pre-order on PlayStation 4, Xbox One, and PC. The Digital Deluxe Edition comes with the season pass, which can also be ordered separately. Pre-ordering provided access to the Call of Duty: Black Ops III multiplayer beta and in-game items for Call of Duty: Advanced Warfare, such as custom reticles, an emblem, a calling card, and Advanced Supply Drops. Sony also announced that the Black Ops III beta would come to the PS4 first on August 19 through August 23, 2015. The beta for the PS4 went live on August 18, 2015, several hours earlier than originally announced. After the beta period ended, it was announced that all pre-orders would include the bonus multiplayer map "NUK3TOWN", a remake of the original "Nuketown" map, featured in Call of Duty: Black Ops, and in Call of Duty: Black Ops II as "Nuketown 2025". Owing to the lack of the campaign mode, the PlayStation 3 and Xbox 360 versions included a digital copy of Black Ops as an added bonus, as well as having their price reduced by 10 dollars compared to the PlayStation 4 and Xbox One versions.

=== Comics tie-in ===
A comic book titled Call of Duty: Black Ops III was announced on July 1, 2015. Serving as a prequel to the game, the first issue was released worldwide on November 4, 2015, and was published by Dark Horse Comics. The story is written by Larry Hama, while Marcelo Ferreira served as the artist for the comic book. The story takes place several years prior to the main events of the game, and stars Jacob Hendricks and John Taylor along with their black ops squadmates in an attempt to stop a Russian terrorist plot. Subsequent issues were released throughout 2016.

On July 11, 2016, Treyarch announced a new comic book series titled Call of Duty: Zombies, to expand upon the story of the Zombies mode. The story features the return of the TranZit team: Abigail "Misty" Briarton, Marlton Johnson, Russman and Samuel Stuhlinger, previously the main protagonists of Call of Duty: Black Ops II, as they embark on a search for an artifact known as the Kronorium, while discovering the truth behind Edward Richtofen's reappearance. The miniseries, also published by Dark Horse, features Justin Jordan as the writer and Jonathan Wayshak as the main artist, while Simon Bisley draws the cover art of each issue. The first issue was released on October 28, 2016, and subsequent issues were released throughout 2017.

=== Special editions and downloadable content ===
In addition to the Digital Deluxe Edition, other special editions include the Hardened Edition and the Juggernog Edition. The Juggernog Edition includes a mini-refrigerator, a season pass and multiple in-game content. A Collector's Edition bonus map for the Zombie mode, "The Giant" was announced. It is a remake of the Call of Duty: World at War map "Der Riese", and features the original characters, Dempsey, Nikolai, Takeo, and Richtofen. A multiplayer-only starter pack for Windows was announced and released on February 16, 2016. It features the multiplayer mode's core mechanics, though certain features, such as the Zombie mode and the Nightmare mode, were excluded. This version of the game is available for players to purchase until the end of February 2016, though it has been made available permanently since.

In December 2015, during Sony's PlayStation Experience event, Activision announced the first downloadable content map pack for Black Ops III, titled "Awakening", and was released first on PlayStation 4 on February 2, 2016. Releases for Windows and Xbox One happened in March 2016. The map pack contains four new multiplayer maps: "Skyjacked" (a remake of the Black Ops II multiplayer map "Hijacked"), "Rise", "Splash", and "Gauntlet", a new Zombies map, Der Eisendrache, and several new gumballs for the Zombie mode. In March 2016, Treyarch revealed the second map pack, titled "Eclipse". The map pack has four new multiplayer maps, including a remake of the World at War map "Bonzai" and a new Zombies map, "Zetsubou no Shima". The map pack was released on April 19 for PlayStation 4 and May 19 for Xbox One and PC.

The third map pack, Descent, was revealed on June 28, 2016, featuring four new MP maps, including a remake of the Black Ops II map "Raid" and a new Zombies map, "Gorod Krovi". The map pack was released on July 12 for PlayStation 4 and August 11 for Xbox One and PC. The PC release of Descent received controversy, for Activision and Treyarch announced that the map packs would no longer be sold separately, and PC players must purchase the season pass to receive all map packs, while owners of Awakening and/or Eclipse would receive discounts upon purchasing the season pass. The fourth map pack, Salvation, was revealed on August 25, 2016, with remakes of the MP maps "Standoff" from Black Ops II and "Outskirt" from World at War, along with the final Zombies map, "Revelations". The map pack was released on September 6 for PlayStation 4, and October 6 for Xbox One and PC.

A fifth and final map pack, Zombies Chronicles, contains remastered versions of 8 Zombies maps from previous games: "Nacht Der Untoten", "Verrückt", and "Shi no Numa" from World at War, "Kino Der Toten", "Ascension", "Shangri-La", and "Moon" from Black Ops, and "Origins" from Black Ops II, and is not included in the season pass of the game. The map pack was released on May 16, 2017, for PlayStation 4, and June 16 for Xbox One and PC.

On May 24, 2017, Activision and Treyarch announced a Multiplayer DLC Trial Pack for the PC version of Black Ops III, allowing all players to play on all multiplayer maps from the four map packs for free for a limited time, while also offering XP bonuses to players who previously owned the map packs and/or the season pass. On March 20, 2018, the Zombies maps from the four map packs were made available for separate purchase on PlayStation 4 and Xbox One, with PC to follow on May 2. On June 11, 2018, Activision and Treyarch announced the "Back in Black" map pack, which contains four remastered versions of fan-favorite multiplayer maps from Black Ops and Black Ops II: "Summit", "Jungle", "Firing Range", and "Slums". These four maps, which are also included in Call of Duty: Black Ops 4 at launch, are offered exclusively to the PlayStation 4 version of the game for players who pre-order Black Ops 4 on the aforementioned platform.

== Reception ==
=== Critical response ===
Reception

Aggregate score
Aggregator	Score
Metacritic	(XONE) 81/100 (PS4) 81/100 (PC) 73/100

Review scores
Publication	Score
Destructoid	8.5/10
Electronic Gaming Monthly	9.5/10
GameSpot	7/10
GamesRadar+	9/10
Giant Bomb	3/5
IGN	(XONE/PS4/PC) 9.2/10 (X360/PS3) 7/10
Polygon	7/10

According to review aggregator Metacritic, Call of Duty: Black Ops III received "generally favorable" critic reviews for PlayStation 4 and Xbox One, and "mixed or average" critic reviews for PC. GameSpot awarded it a score of 7 out of 10, saying, "Black Ops III doesn't offer anything remarkable to the series, but does just enough to maintain the Call of Duty status quo. The franchise, however slowly, continues its inexorable march." Polygon also gave the game a score of 7 out of 10, saying "Black Ops III's biggest point of recommendation may be the breadth of content there, and that's a valid point of view. But Treyarch doesn't meaningfully move the series forward here." IGN awarded it a score of 9.2 out of 10, saying "With fun 4-player co-op, new powers, and a fleshed out Zombies mode, Black Ops 3 is the biggest Call of Duty game yet." Stuart Andrews of Trusted Reviews criticized the setting and narrative, writing "Black Ops 3 is a solid installment that will please the series' hardcore fans, but it's not a mainstream crowd-pleaser in the way that last year's Advanced Warfare was", and unfavorably compared it to its predecessors, disparaging that it "focuses entirely on the sci-fi stuff, loses most of its conspiracy theory trappings and brings augmented super-soldiers in. The result sometimes feels less like a third Black Ops game than Call of Duty: Even More Advanced Warfare."

The PS3 and Xbox 360 versions received less praise than the other versions. IGN's Brian Albert criticised the lack of the campaign in these versions, as well as the poor graphics and long waiting times, but concluded that despite these versions issues, they were still very fun to play.

=== Sales ===
Black Ops III sold over 6.6 million copies in its first week of sales (not including digital) and grossed over $550 million in sales during its first three days of release. In the United Kingdom, the game bested Halo 5: Guardians to become the top selling game. Black Ops III was the top best selling game in the US according to NPD's figures. Black Ops III later became the top selling game of 2015. According to Activision, Black Ops III was one of the best-selling games released for the eighth generation of video game consoles, and that its financial performance is significantly better than its predecessor, Call of Duty: Advanced Warfare. By December 2024, Black Ops III had sold over 43 million copies.

=== Awards ===
List of awards and nominations
Award	Category	Result	Ref.
The Game Award	Best Shooter	Nominated	
The Game Award	Best Multiplayer	Nominated	

== Legacy ==
Retrospective assessments of Call of Duty: Black Ops III have been mixed. The staff of NME described the game as a "forgettable" entry, with "just too much going on and so little freedom". Critics have criticized the campaign as confusing and convoluted; Chris Freiberg of Den of Geek argued that the narrative was weaker when playing solo rather than cooperative. Responses to the multiplayer were also mixed, with some divided on the introduction of Specialists and weapon balancing. Several argued that the experience improved upon the futuristic mechanics of Advanced Warfare, generating comparisons to Titanfall (2014). Nevertheless, Freiberg argued that the game represented the start of the franchise being inspired by competitors rather than innovating on its own.

While the game has generally placed below the top 10 in lists ranking the series' games, several have shown appreciation for Black Ops III, with Complex's Dan Wenerowicz calling it the fifth-best Call of Duty game ever in 2024. Additionally, Dominic Allen of Screen Rant argued that the multiplayer and Zombies modes were the series' best iterations. Allen highlighted the former's map designs and weapons, and the maps and addition of GobbleGums to the latter, making the mode a fan-favorite. Allen called the addition of Supply Drops the game's worst feature. Reflecting on the game's position within the series, ComicBook.com's Cade Onder argued that Black Ops III "pushed the series in exciting new directions, even if it wouldn't maintain course for much longer".
