= Call of Duty: Black Ops II =

2012 video game

- Developer: Treyarch (Note: Ports for PlayStation 4 and PlayStation 5 by Iron Galaxy)
- Publisher: Activision (Note: Japanese localization published by Square Enix)
- Director: Dave Anthony
- Producer: Pat Dwyer
- Designers: David Vonderhaar; Jimmy Zielinski
- Artist: Colin Whitney
- Writers: Dave Anthony; David S. Goyer; Craig Houston
- Composers: Jack Wall; Trent Reznor
- Series: Call of Duty
- Engine: IW 3.0 (modified)
- Platforms: PlayStation 3; Windows; Xbox 360; Wii U; PlayStation 4; PlayStation 5
- Release: PS3, Windows, Xbox 360: WW: November 13, 2012; Wii U: NA: November 18, 2012; PAL: November 30, 2012; PS4, PS5: WW: July 9, 2026
- Genre: First-person shooter
- Modes: Single-player, multiplayer

Call of Duty: Black Ops II is a 2012 first-person shooter game developed by Treyarch and published by Activision. It was released for Windows, PlayStation 3, and Xbox 360 on November 13, 2012, and for the Wii U on November 18 in North America and November 30 in PAL regions. Black Ops II is the ninth game in the Call of Duty franchise of video games, a sequel to the 2010 game Call of Duty: Black Ops and the first Call of Duty game for the Wii U. A corresponding game for the PlayStation Vita, Call of Duty: Black Ops: Declassified, was developed by nStigate Games and also released on November 13. Ports for the PlayStation 4 and PlayStation 5, developed by Iron Galaxy Studios, were released on July 9, 2026.

In the 1980s, the player switches control between Alex Mason and Frank Woods, the former being one of the protagonists from Black Ops, while in 2025, the player assumes control of Mason's son, David (codenamed "Section"). Both time periods involve the characters pursuing Raul Menendez, a Nicaraguan arms dealer and later terrorist, who is responsible for kidnapping David in the 80s and later sparking a Second Cold War in 2025. The campaign features non-linear gameplay and has multiple endings. Locations featured in the game include Angola, Myanmar, Afghanistan, Nicaragua, Pakistan, the Cayman Islands, Panama, Yemen, the United States, and Haiti.

Development for the game began soon after the release of Black Ops, with Activision promising that the follow-up would bring "meaningful innovation" to the Call of Duty franchise. Black Ops II is the first game in the series to feature futuristic warfare technology and the first to present branching storylines driven by player choice as well as selecting weapons before starting story mode missions. It also offers a 3D display option. The game was officially revealed on May 1, 2012, following a set of leaked information released during the previous months.

Black Ops II received mostly positive reviews from critics, with praise for its gameplay variety, story, multiplayer, Zombies mode, and villain, while its Strike Force missions received criticism. Retrospective reviewers consider it one of the best games in the series. The game was a commercial success; within 24 hours of its release, it grossed over $500 million. It had remained the largest entertainment launch of all time until the release of Grand Theft Auto V (2013). By November 2013, the game had sold over 24 million copies, making it one of the series' best-selling entries.

Sequels to the game continued or expanded the storyline: Call of Duty: Black Ops III (2015) acts as a direct sequel; Call of Duty: Black Ops Cold War (2020) is set between the events of Black Ops and Black Ops II; Call of Duty: Black Ops 6 (2024) is set after Black Ops II's flashback missions; and Call of Duty: Black Ops 7 (2025) is set after the events of Black Ops II.

== Gameplay ==
=== Campaign ===
Tactical view in a Strike Force mission

Black Ops II is the first Call of Duty video game to feature branching storylines, in which the player's choice affects both the current mission and in turn, the overall course of the story. Known as "Strike Force missions", these branching storylines appear during the 2025 storyline and feature permadeath. The success or failure of these missions can have ramifications for the wider campaign storyline. Choosing one of the missions locks out the others unless the player begins a fresh campaign.

Strike Force missions allow the player to control a number of different war assets, such as unmanned aerial vehicles, jet fighters and robots. If the player dies in a Strike Force mission, the campaign continues recording that loss, as opposed to letting the player load a previously saved checkpoint. The player's progress in the Strike Force missions may go on to change even the plans of the story's antagonist, Raul Menendez. By the end of the game, the player may have changed the results of the new Cold War.

Similarly, in the main story missions, there are certain points where the player is given different choices and paths to progress, which could have an effect on the gameplay, as well as the story. Black Ops II is also the first game in the series to allow the player to customize their loadout before beginning a mission, creating freedom in choosing how to approach a mission.

=== Multiplayer ===
One of the biggest changes added to multiplayer mode in Black Ops II is the introduction of Pick 10, a new system within the Create-a-Class menu. Pick 10 gives the player a total of 10 allocation slots in a class, which are used for guns, perks, and grenades. The player can customize the slot allocation, to either have more attachments for a gun, or more perks.

Killstreaks from previous Call of Duty games are renamed as Scorestreaks, which are now earned by gaining points, rather than kills. This allows the player to focus on objective modes, which also earn points towards Scorestreaks.

Unlike past games, weapons in Black Ops II have a progression system, which is used to unlock weapon attachments. After maxing out a weapon's level, the player can choose to "prestige" the gun, similar to how they can prestige the player level, and reset their attachment progress. In exchange, the player can customize their weapons with custom clan tags and emblems.

Black Ops II is also the first Call of Duty game to include a competitive mode. Known as League Play, the mode allows players of similar skill level to be matched together, and play according to the rules of Major League Gaming.

=== Zombies ===
Treyarch confirmed that the Zombies mode would return for Black Ops II with new game modes. This is the third Call of Duty game to feature a Zombies mode, following Call of Duty: World at War and Call of Duty: Black Ops, and the first to have game modes other than the traditional Survival mode. Treyarch also confirmed that Zombies would run on the game's multiplayer engine, allowing for a deeper community experience, along with new features. A new, 8 player co-op game called "Grief" is also supported, featuring 2 teams of 4 players competing to survive, unlike the previous games which only supported 4 player online co-op. As with the previous installments, each Zombies map contains "Easter eggs" side quests, which is used to progress the story. Another new mode, "Turned", is introduced with several downloadable content maps, in which one player attempts to survive three player-controlled zombies who must turn the other player into a zombie.

== Synopsis ==
=== Campaign ===
In July 1986, retired CIA operative Alex Mason (Sam Worthington) lives an obscure life in Alaska with his son David. One day, his former handler Jason Hudson (Michael Keaton) shows up with an assignment: Mason's friend and fellow operative Frank Woods (Note: Previously presumed dead in Call of Duty: Black Ops (2010), Woods survived and was shuffled between a series of North Vietnamese prisons, before escaping and being rescued in 1972.) (James C. Burns) disappeared in Angola investigating an arms smuggling ring and needs to be found. After aiding Jonas Savimbi's (Robert Wisdom) UNITA rebels against the MPLA, Mason and Hudson rescue Woods from a barge on the Cubango River, subsequently encountering Nicaraguan arms dealer Raul Menendez (Kamar de los Reyes). After a firefight, the trio are rescued by Savimbi, and Menendez is revealed to be Woods' captor. In September 1986, the CIA authorizes a strike against Menendez, now profiteering from the Soviet–Afghan War. The trio travels to Afghanistan, meets Chinese intelligence operative Tian Zhao (Byron Mann), and allies with the Afghan mujahideen against the Soviets. After capturing Colonel Lev Kravchenko (Note: Also survived his apparent death in Call of Duty: Black Ops (2010).) (Andrew Divoff), Menendez's partner, Mason's brainwashing resurfaces. If Mason resists during Kravchenko's interrogation, the latter reveals Menendez has moles in the CIA before Woods executes him. Regardless, the mujahideen betray the Americans and Zhao, leaving them to die in the desert until their rescue by two travelers; Mason hallucinates that one of them is Viktor Reznov (Gary Oldman).

Menendez's anti-American sentiment is revealed to have started after his sister Josefina (Eden Riegel) was disfigured in a fire linked to an American businessman's insurance fraud. When an earthquake in 1972 left his family destitute, Menendez and his father began running drugs, leading the CIA to assassinate his father. After Afghanistan, Mason, Woods, Hudson, and Panamanian forces led by Manuel Noriega (Benito Martinez) raid Menendez's compound in Nicaragua. Woods, seeking revenge, attempts to kill Menendez despite orders to take him alive. However, Woods accidentally kills Josefina, with Menendez also presumably killed; Menendez conspires with Noriega to fake his demise. In December 1989, during the American invasion of Panama, Mason and Woods capture Noriega for a prisoner swap, but Woods is tricked into shooting Mason. Menendez then reveals himself and shoots Woods in the kneecaps, crippling him; Menendez had previously kidnapped David, coercing Hudson into luring Mason and Woods into a trap. Menendez murders Hudson, before promising to complete his revenge against Woods in the future. In the aftermath, a handicapped Woods raises David in Mason's place, while hiding the true circumstances of his father's death.

In 2014, Menendez (under the name Odysseus) forms a militant populist movement known as Cordis Die. In 2018, the organization stages a cyberattack that cripples the Chinese stock exchanges, sparking a Second Cold War between NATO and the Chinese-led Strategic Defense Coalition headed by Zhao. By 2025, Cordis Die boasts an estimated two billion followers while David (Rich McDonald), now a DEVGRU Lieutenant Commander codenamed Section, leads JSOC and his squadmates Mike Harper (Michael Rooker) and Javier Salazar (Celestino Cornielle) to neutralize Menendez. Section and Harper visit "The Vault," a CIA retirement home where an elderly Woods resides. Woods tells them that Menendez recently visited him and gave him a heart-shaped pendant belonging to Josefina. Section and Harper listen to Woods recount his past encounters with Menendez.

After raiding a Cordis Die compound in Myanmar, Section's team learns Menendez is planning a second cyberattack using 'celerium', a rare-earth element that could create a powerful computer virus. Spying on Menendez in Lahore, they discover he's after "Karma", a hacker named Chloe Lynch (Erin Cahill). The team infiltrates Colossus, an exotic, floating city in the Cayman Islands, aiming to rescue Lynch and kill Menendez's lieutenant, DeFalco (Julian Sands). Troubled by flashbacks of Panama, Section visits Woods again and learns the truth behind his father's death. On June 19, JSOC captures Menendez in Socotra, Yemen, with help from CIA agent Farid (Omid Abtahi). Menendez is escorted aboard the USS Barack Obama, commanded by Admiral Tommy Briggs (Tony Todd). During interrogation, Menendez escapes with help from Salazar, his mole inside JSOC. Menendez then uploads his celerium virus, hijacking all American drones, and sending them towards American and Chinese cities. Section responds to an attack on Los Angeles during the G20, where he escorts the U.S. President to safety with help from Secret Service agent Eric Samuels (John Eric Bentley). Menendez is tracked to Haiti, where Section leads JSOC to raid the Cordis Die facility. Section intercepts Menendez trying to flee and subdues him, with the decision to execute or reapprehend him.

==== Endings ====
The ending achieved is determined by the fates of Menendez, Lynch, and Alex Mason, as well as whether the Strike Force missions were completed.

- If Section executes Menendez, a pre-recorded video is uploaded to YouTube in which Menendez posthumously commands Cordis Die to revolt. Cordis Die supporters launch a massive global insurrection, resulting in the burning of the White House and widespread anarchy. This ending is canon and sets the stage for Black Ops 7 and Black Ops III.
- If Section reapprehends Menendez and Lynch survives, she will prevent Menendez's cyberattack and he will remain imprisoned, watching Lynch being interviewed on Jimmy Kimmel Live, where she insults Menendez as he rages in his cell.
- If Section reapprehends Menendez and Lynch was killed or not rescued, Menendez's cyberattack will succeed, and he will break out of prison. He infiltrates the Vault and murders Woods with the heart-shaped pendant, then travels to Josefina's grave, digs up her corpse, and lights himself on fire.
- If all the Strike Force missions were completed, resulting in Zhao's assassination, China and the United States will ally, ending the Second Cold War. This is also considered canon for Black Ops III.

Additionally, if Mason survives being shot by Woods, he will reunite with him and Section at the Vault in 2025. If he does not, Section retires from the military after visiting his father's grave. The latter ending is canon, with Mason's death setting the stage for Black Ops 6 and Black Ops 7.

A non-canon post-credits scene depicts Woods and Menendez performing the Avenged Sevenfold single "Carry On" with the band in front of a concert with the rest of the cast.

=== Zombies ===
| No. | Title | Original release date |
|---|---|---|
| 1 | "Nuketown Zombies" | November 13, 2012 |
In 2025, a squad of CIA and CDC operatives investigate a nuclear testing site in Nevada known as "Nuketown", where they are attacked by zombies. At the same time, Dr. Edward Richtofen (Nolan North) seizes control of the zombies by entering the Aether from Griffin Station on the Moon. After some time, three missiles loaded with Element 115, the element responsible for the reanimation of dead cells, are launched from the Moon towards Earth, completely destroying its atmosphere. (Note: As depicted in Call of Duty: Black Ops (2010)) One missile completely destroys Nuketown and all present, except for one individual, Marlton Johnson (Scott Menville), who escapes after hiding out in the site's bunker.
| 2 | "TranZit" | November 13, 2012 |
As a result of the catastrophe, Earth has been reduced to a crumbling, hellish wasteland overrun by zombies. In this new world, four survivors — Samuel Stuhlinger (David Boat), Abigail "Misty" Briarton (Stephanie Lemelin), Marlton, and Russman (Keith Szarabajka) — have banded together to survive in Hanford, Washington with the help of a bus driven by a robotic driver. The four are contacted by Dr. Ludvig Maxis (Fred Tatasciore), Richtofen's rival, asking for their help against Richtofen; Stuhlinger is contacted separately by Richtofen himself, asking for the same against Maxis. Both former scientists request the four to assist them in powering up a tower within the area to work in their favor.
| 3 | "Die Rise" | January 29, 2013 |
Once done, regardless of the path they choose, the survivors are teleported by Richtofen to a crumbling skyline in the ruins of Shanghai. The four learn of The Flesh, a cannibalistic cult that chooses to eat zombie meat, as well as the beginnings of a new airborne pandemic of Element 115. Stuhlinger is threatened by Richtofen, who knows of his past as a member of The Flesh, which allows only him to hear Richtofen and not the others. At the site, Maxis and Richtofen once again instruct the four to power up a second tower.
| 4 | "Mob of the Dead" | April 16, 2013 |
During the Great Depression, four mobsters — Salvatore "Sal" DeLuca (Chazz Palminteri), Billy Handsome (Ray Liotta), Michael "Finn" O'Leary (Michael Madsen), and Albert "Weasel" Arlington (Joe Pantoliano) — are incarcerated at Alcatraz Island. On New Year's Eve 1933, the four attempt to escape the prison, using Weasel's plan to build a makeshift airplane called Icarus. However, the prison becomes infested with zombies, and they are forced to fight their way out. They succeed in building the airplane, but crash-land at the Golden Gate Bridge, before being teleported back to the prison, with no memories of their previous attempt (except Weasel, who keeps a journal of the ongoing events). After many failed attempts, they discover they are actually stuck in Purgatory, constantly repeating a cycle as punishment for their past sins. In reality, the escape plan never came to fruition, and Weasel was killed by the other three on New Year's Eve, while the rest were given the death penalty weeks later. Having remembered the truth, Sal, Billy and Finn set out to kill Weasel once again. Two possible endings can occur: if Weasel is killed, the cycle will repeat (Note: As hinted in Call of Duty: Black Ops III (2015).); if Weasel lives and the other three are killed, the cycle is broken, and he is freed of his punishment. (Note: As depicted in Call of Duty: Black Ops 4 (2018).)
| 5 | "Buried" | July 2, 2013 |
Following their battles in Shanghai, Russman leads the survivors across the continents to a large hole in the ground known as The Rift in Africa, hoping to find answers about the unseen forces commanding them. Richtofen once again commands Stuhlinger to convince the others to help him power the third tower in his favor. The four travel underground to find a Western town warped from its original place by temporal displacement. Here, they enlist the help of a mute giant, Arthur, to further their progress. Based on the survivors' choice in Washington and Shanghai, two possible endings can occur: In the canonical ending, the survivors aid Maxis, allowing him to use the power from the towers to enter the Aether and assume ultimate control, trapping Richtofen in a zombie's body. However, the Earth begins shaking, and Maxis explains to the four that he is beginning the process of the destruction of the Earth and humanity to reach Agartha, where he believes his daughter Samantha (Julie Nathanson) is.; In the non-canon ending, the survivors aid Richtofen, letting him gain unlimited power over the Aether and the Earth, allowing him to kill Maxis and condemn Samantha's soul to eternal damnation. Richtofen also uses Stuhlinger as his human vessel, but finds himself unable to escape afterwards.
| 6 | "Origins" | August 27, 2013 |
Following the canonical ending, Maxis plucks Samantha's soul from Richtofen's body and brings her to Agartha. Realizing her father’s corruption by the Aether, Samantha contacts an alternate version of Maxis, drawing her to Northern France during World War I. Here, Group 935, which was founded much earlier, develops massive mechanical robots and elemental staffs to aid Germany’s war effort. In 1918, Group 935 stumbles upon an ancient tomb believed to be of Vril origin, unleashing the first known zombie outbreak in history. The United States, Russia, and Japan send their agents: "Tank" Dempsey (Steve Blum), Nikolai Belinski (Fred Tatasciore), and Takeo Masaki (Tom Kane), respectively, to capture Richtofen, the mastermind behind the advanced technology. While most of Group 935 is wiped out by the zombies, Richtofen lobotomizes Maxis to prevent him from turning undead. The group is contacted by Samantha, who begs them to free her from Agartha. Richtofen puts Maxis' brain in a flying drone, and he joins the fight against the zombies and to free Samantha. The group succeeds, and while Maxis meets his daughter, they enter Agartha to be rewarded. A final cutscene shows Samantha with a boy named Eddie inside a house playing with toys of the characters who have appeared in the Zombies game mode throughout all three games. Air raid sirens are heard and the two children retreat to the basement with Maxis, with Samantha noting her father has a plan to make the heroes of their games real.

== Development ==
Activision Blizzard CEO Bobby Kotick stated on November 8, 2011, that a new Call of Duty game was in development for a 2012 release and would be the newest installment in the franchise. The game was officially confirmed by Activision during its fourth-quarter earnings call on February 9, 2012, who promised that it would feature "meaningful innovation" for the series. Oliver North, who was involved in the Iran–Contra affair was a consultant on the 1980s portion and helped promote the game. The author and defense expert Peter W. Singer served as a consultant on the 2025 storyline of the game.

=== Gameplay revisions ===
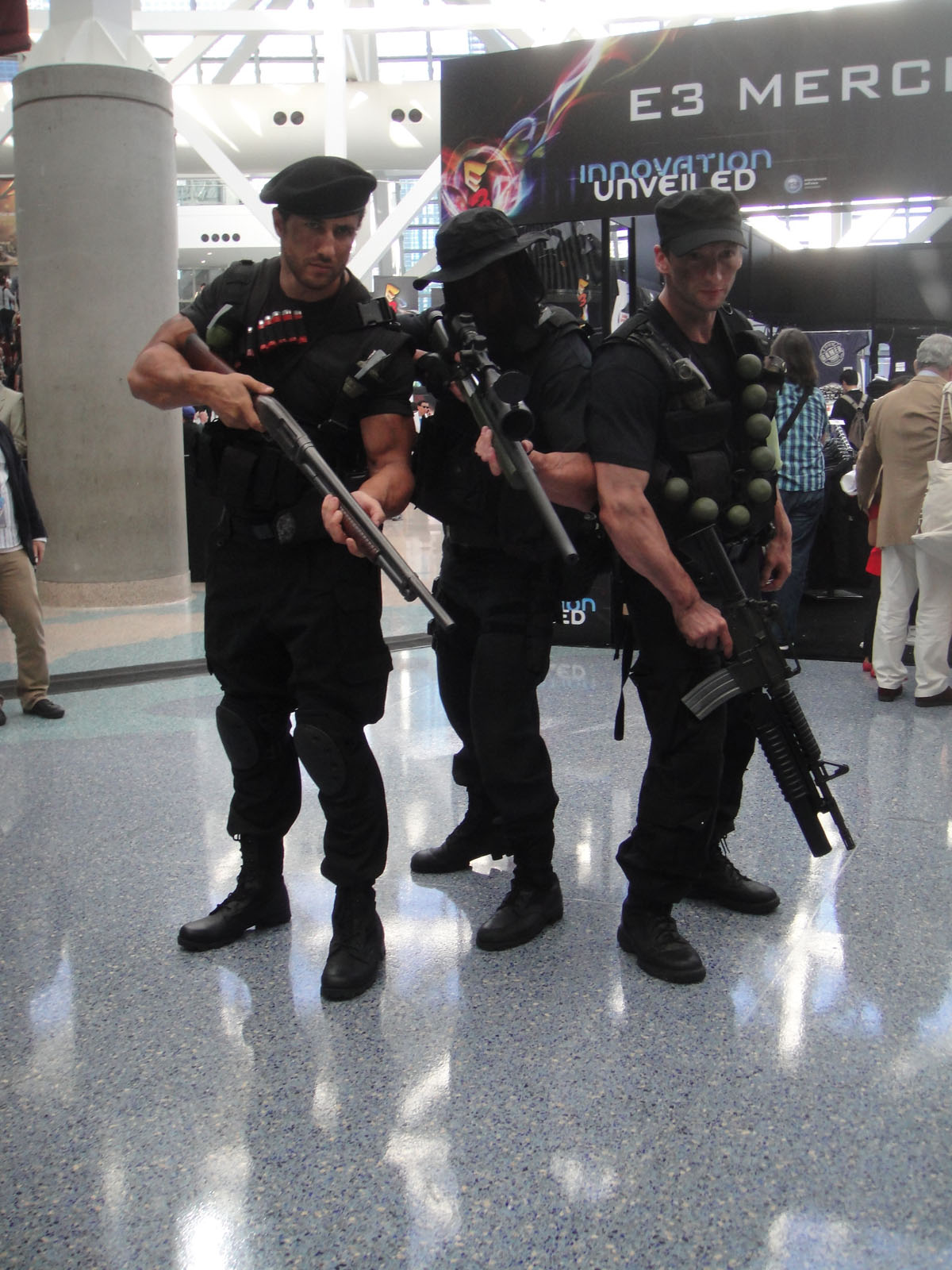
Promotion at E3 2012

In developing Black Ops II, Treyarch introduced several revisions to the gameplay mechanics for online multiplayer that have been a hallmark of the Call of Duty franchise. These include the introduction of "multi-team" games that allow matches to host three or more teams of players, in contrast to the traditional two factions, and revisions to the "Create-A-Class" function that allows users to select which guns, attachments, weapon camouflage and perks (additional bonuses that alter aspects of gameplay) to use in multiplayer matches. The "Kill Streak" function, which gives players in-game rewards for killing other players, was revised and is now known as "Score Streaks".

Whereas players still receive in-game rewards, these are unlocked by performing certain actions – such as killing other players, successfully capturing territory, and so on – rather than simply killing other players. Furthermore, the "wager matches" feature included in Call of Duty: Black Ops was removed. These changes were introduced to shift the emphasis towards objective-based gameplay, to reward players who work in teams and to make the game more accessible to new players.

There is also 3D support if players are playing with an HDMI cable on a 3D TV. Before entering multiplayer mode, there is a 3D setting in the "options" menu.

=== Soundtrack ===
Call of Duty: Black Ops II (Original Soundtrack)

Soundtrack album by Jack Wall
- Released: November 13, 2012
- Genre: Video game soundtrack
- Length: 2:28:49

The game's soundtrack was composed by Jack Wall, with the main theme composed by Nine Inch Nails frontman and film score composer Trent Reznor. The soundtrack was released as a part of the Hardened Edition and Care Package releases, as well as on iTunes and Amazon, with two supplemental tracks by Brian Tuey, as well as "Symphony No. 40 in G minor, K550 (Allegro Molto)" by Wolfgang Amadeus Mozart. Also, a version of the song "Try It Out" by Skrillex and Alvin Risk is used in the game, but it is not present in the soundtrack album. When the Campaign is completed, after the end credits, Woods and Menendez perform a concert with heavy metal band Avenged Sevenfold on their song "Carry On", with Woods on drums and Menendez on rhythm guitar. The band chose to use Woods as the drummer in the game due to the loss of their original drummer The Rev, who died of a drug overdose on December 28, 2009. The band's song "Shepherd of Fire" is featured on the Zombie map "Origins". Additional artists include Sean Murray, Jimmy Hinson, Sergio Jimenez Lacima, Kamar de los Reyes, Azam Ali, & Rudy Cardenas. A war track pack containing a selection of Black Ops II songs is featured in Black Ops Cold War's season two battle pass.

== Release ==
=== Internal leaks ===
In February 2012, a product page for Call of Duty: Black Ops 2 appeared on Amazon France and was quickly taken down. No information had yet been released by Activision, but Gameblog claimed that Activision demanded the removal of its original report too. When it refused to do so, the publisher reportedly cut off Gameblog from ad support, review game mailings, and future Activision events for refusing to comply. Activision denied Gameblog's claims that it had been cut off. Around the same time, computer game artist Hugo Beyer also listed "Black Ops 2" as his current project in his LinkedIn CV, then removed his LinkedIn page. Beyer is an artist working for Nerve Software, "a Dallas-based independent developer" which has "helped" with previous Activision games including Black Ops in 2010. A "Black Ops 2" trademark by Activision was spotted January 2012. Further, Black Ops 2 was listed by the France international entertainment retail chain Fnac in March 2012, which touted a predictable November release date.

On April 9, 2012, an image was leaked on the official Call of Duty website, which leaked the Call of Duty: Black Ops 2 logo, as well as a revealing date of April 28, 2012. The URL was later removed. On April 18, 2012, Kotaku received an image from "a retail source", which showed a teaser poster that lacked a game title but had clear clues to Black Ops and a May 2 date that seemingly points to an unveiling. On April 27, 2012, an image containing two Target pre-order cards sent by IGN reader Richard confirmed the game's title and release date. The cards clearly display the Call of Duty: Black Ops II logo, and the release date November 13, 2012.

=== Reveal ===
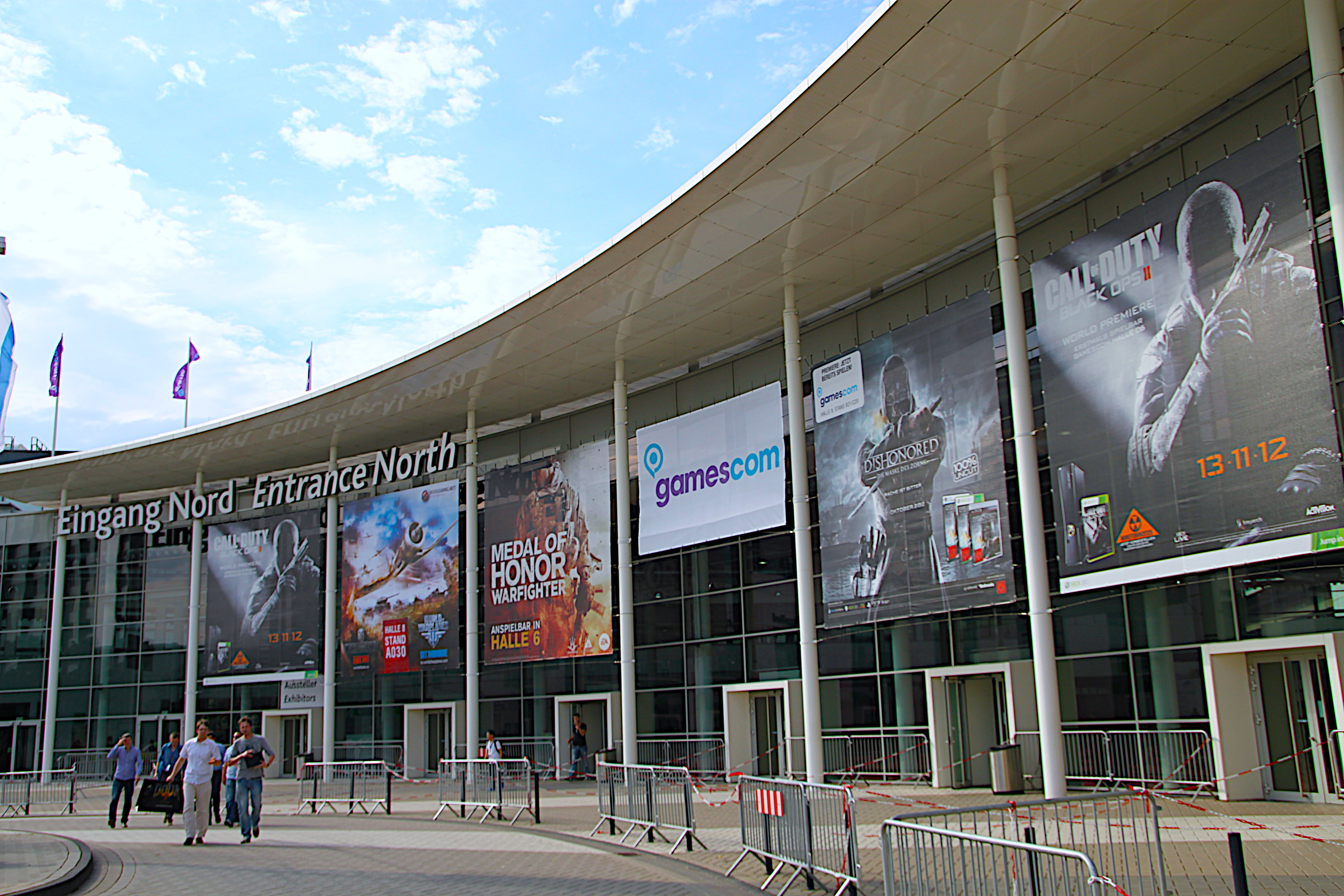
Call of Duty: Black Ops II advertisements at Gamescom 2012

On April 23, 2012, Activision redesigned CallofDuty.com to announce that the game would be revealed on May 1, 2012, during the NBA playoffs on TNT. The art featured on the site matched up perfectly with the supposed retailer leak received by Kotaku. However, parts of the official website went live hours prior to the announcement, which revealed the title, confirmed the release date for PC, PlayStation 3 and Xbox 360, and the "21st Century Cold War" setting. Activision had hinted that the game may eventually become available for Nintendo's own consoles, although had no official announcements for the time being. As promised by Activision, the preview for the game was revealed in the form of a YouTube trailer that detailed the futuristic setting, the characters carried over from the previous games, and the conflict.

After the game was revealed, the preorder rates on the game set records three times higher than for the preorders of the first Black Ops. Critics have noted the trailer's similarities to that of Metal Gear Solid 4: Guns of the Patriots. On July 19, 2012, a second trailer was released by Treyarch, offering insight into the game's narrative. The storyline was described by writer David S. Goyer as "better than a Hollywood movie".

=== Japanese releases ===
Square Enix released the game for the Japanese market on November 22, 2012, as a subbed version. A Japanese voice-dubbed version was released separately on December 20, 2012. The script for this version was translated by Zenigame Nakamoto. The translated version was criticized for its translation errors. The Japanese release of the Wii U port is only the dubbed version since the console was not available in Japan in November.

=== The Replacers ===
To promote the release of Black Ops II's DLC packs, Activision released a series of live-action shorts starring Peter Stormare as The Replacer, an undercover agent sent to take the place of clients in their daily lives, while said clients can stay at home and play Black Ops II's new content. After explaining his duties, Stormare is then shown in multiple situations where he has taken over random people's jobs, such as masquerading as a pregnant lady's husband, working at an office, and enduring a grandmother's endless talking, among other such scenarios.

For Black Ops II's second DLC, entitled "Uprising", comedian J.B. Smoove joined Stormare in the second production of The Replacers, in which the two maintain a haphazard relationship. Stormare normally acts as a mentor to the new replacer Smoove by pointing out his various quirks while doing his job, such as his poor performance defending his client while he replaces a lawyer, admitting that he might be guilty.

=== Downloadable content ===
Treyarch released the Black Ops II Season Pass alongside the game. On December 12, 2012, all Xbox 360 Season Pass holders received access to the Nuketown Zombies map, with PC holders following on January 17, and PlayStation 3 holders on January 19, having been delayed two days due to PSN technical issues. It was later released as an individual download for PC on April 13, 2013.

The first major DLC pack is called Revolution. It was announced on January 8, 2013, and released for Xbox 360 on January 29 and PC and PS3 on February 28 The pack contained four new multiplayer maps: "Downhill", "Hydro", "Mirage" and "Grind"; and two new Zombies content: the mode Turned and the map "Die Rise". Also included was the first DLC weapon, the Peacekeeper. Turned occurs in the Diner segment of the "TranZit" map from the original release, and allows up to four players to fight each other in two teams – one human against three zombies. The "Die Rise" map is a larger zombies survival map taking place in two semi-destroyed skyscrapers in Shanghai, where one to four players use elevators to travel between floors.

Personalization pack microtransactions for the game were released for Xbox 360 on March 12, 2013, and PC and PS3 on April 12. These allow the player to make small aesthetic changes to the multiplayer functionality of the game, such as adding their country's flag to the kill notification box, adding new weapon skins, and creating more Create-a-Class slots for players.

The second major DLC pack is known as "Uprising". It was released for Xbox 360 on April 16, 2013, and came out for PC and PS3 players on May 16. It includes the new zombies map "Mob of the Dead" as well as new multiplayer maps "Magma", "Vertigo", "Encore", and a re-imagining of the fan-favorite Black Ops map "Firing Range", known as Studio.

The third major DLC pack is called "Vengeance". It was released for Xbox 360 on July 2, 2013, and for PC and PS3 on August 1. It includes new zombies map "Buried" as well as new multiplayer maps "Cove", "Detour", "Rush" and a remake of the popular map "Summit" from Black Ops: "Uplink".

The fourth and final major DLC pack is called "Apocalypse". It was released for Xbox 360 on August 27, 2013, and PC and PS3 on September 26. It includes new zombies map "Origins" back to the old characters (Takeo, Nikolai, Richtofen and Dempsey), as well as new multiplayer maps "Pod", "Frost" and two remakes of popular maps "Courtyard" and "Stadium" from Call of Duty: World at War and Black Ops: "First Strike" DLC.

On August 7, 2014, Activision released "Nuketown 2025" for the Wii U Version. None of the DLC packs released for the Xbox 360, PS3, and PC were released for Wii U.

=== Rereleases ===
In May 2026, entries for Black Ops and Black Ops II appeared on the website for the Game Rating and Administration Committee, which sparked speculation on remasters of both titles for modern consoles. The following month, Treyarch confirmed in a social media post that Iron Galaxy Studios worked on the ports, which would be exclusive to PlayStation 4 and PlayStation 5 and would release in July. The ports were released on July 9, 2026.

== Reception ==
Reception

Aggregate score
| Aggregator | Score |
|---|---|
| Metacritic | (PC) 74/100 (PS3) 83/100 (WiiU) 81/100 (X360) 83/100 |

Review scores
| Publication | Score |
|---|---|
| 1Up.com | B+ |
| G4 | 4.5/5 |
| Game Informer | 8.5/10 |
| GameSpot | 8.0/10 |
| GameTrailers | 9.4/10 |
| IGN | 9.3/10 |
| PlayStation Official Magazine – UK | 8/10 |
| Official Xbox Magazine (UK) | 8/10 |
| Official Xbox Magazine (US) | 8.5/10 |

=== Critical reception ===
Call of Duty: Black Ops II received "generally positive" reviews for the PlayStation 3, Xbox 360, and Wii U versions, but "mixed or average" reviews for the PC version, according to review aggregator Metacritic. IGN editor Anthony Gallegos describes the game as "a good example of how to evolve an annualized franchise". Gallegos praised the game for telling a story was genuinely interesting and creating a villain that he empathised with to the point of questioning his own actions over the course of the story. Gallegos directed criticisms at the artificial intelligence of allies in Strike Force mode and at the ending of the campaign, which he felt was disappointing even though he was aware that the outcome was directly influenced by the choices he made.

Marty Sliva of 1UP gave the game a B+ while praising its freedom of choice in game modes and gameplay variety: "I was surprised with the risks that Treyarch took in the name of delivering a unique and creative experience. Not all of them paid off, but knowing that the team was willing to eschew the safe route helped ward off any stagnation that may have begun to creep into the series as of late."

Dan Ryckert of Game Informer was also critical of the artificial intelligence of Strike Force mode, and was unimpressed by the "Pick Ten" system introduced to multiplayer modes, noting that it was "interesting, but ultimately less exciting" than the system used in previous Call of Duty titles. Like Gallegos, Ryckert praised the narrative and structure of the single-player campaign, introducing changes that he felt were overdue and noting that the branching storylines "had me talking to others about their experiences in a way I had never done before with this [Call of Duty] series".

Steven O'Donnell and Stephanie Bendixsen, of Australian video game talk show Good Game, both gave the game an 8.5 out of 10, praising the gameplay multiplayer and zombies mode, but were critical of the campaign's confusing narrative and Strike Force missions. In particular to the narrative, Good Game was critical of the opening battle where the player guns down fleeing Angolan soldiers, feeling that it was added purely for shock value and commenting that:

The landscape of shooters is changing somewhat. The fact is that everyone loves playing military shooters, but we're also realising that we don't want to glorify aimless killings. A lot of games are trying to make you feel that conflict and even make you feel bad about what you're doing. But I don't think it's been handled very well here.

Frederick Charles Fripp of IT News Africa gave it a final score of 9.2/10 and wrote that "BO2 is a non-stop action-packed shooter that will keep gamers on their toes and on the edge of their seats. It has everything a player could want in a game: great graphics, a good story, easy controls and superb acting."

During the 16th Annual D.I.C.E. Awards, the Academy of Interactive Arts & Sciences nominated Black Ops II for outstanding achievement in "Connectivity", "Online Gameplay" and "Visual Engineering".

=== Sales and revenue ===
Activision reported Black Ops II grossed over $500 million in its first 24 hours, making it the biggest entertainment launch of all time until the record was surpassed by Grand Theft Auto V in September 2013. It is the fourth year in a row that the Call of Duty series has broken the same record. 2011's Call of Duty: Modern Warfare 3 grossed $400 million on one full day; 2010's Call of Duty: Black Ops grossed $360 million on day one; in 2009, Call of Duty: Modern Warfare 2 brought in $310 million. By November 24, 2012, it had sold more than 7.5 million copies in the United States.

Black Ops II went on to gross $1 billion in the first 15 days of availability, beating Modern Warfare 3's record of the first 16 days. On November 5, 2013, IGN confirmed that the game sold 24.2 million copies, making it the third highest-selling game in the series, behind 2010's Black Ops, and 2011's Modern Warfare 3.

=== Lawsuits ===
In July 2014, Manuel Noriega sued Activision for lost profits from the use of his likeness in the game. He also claims that his inclusion translated to higher sales of Black Ops II. Noriega makes an appearance in the Cold War portions of the game and aids the primary antagonist. The suit sought compensation for lost profits and damages for his depiction as a "kidnapper, murderer, and enemy of the state" in the game. On October 28, the Los Angeles court dismissed the lawsuit, ruling that Noriega's inclusion was protected under free speech laws.

The publisher, Activision, was also sued in a French court by family members of Jonas Savimbi, who thought his portrayal in the game was inaccurate, saying he was portrayed as a "barbarian". Three of his children wanted 1 million euros for damages. The French court dismissed the case in 2016. Savimbi appears early on in the game, leading UNITA rebels during a fictitious engagement of Operation Alpha Centauri.

== Legacy ==
Retrospective assessments rank Call of Duty: Black Ops II among the series' best installments, with some considering it a "standout", the best Call of Duty title ever, and Treyarch's best game in the series. The campaign has been praised for its futuristic setting, mission variety, and multiple endings. The staff of IGN picked Raul Menendez as one of the series' best villains. Chris Freiberg of Den of Geek highlighted the campaign for its freedom and replayability, further praising the addition of customizable loadouts and the player's choices directly impacting the narrative.

The game's multiplayer has been called "iconic". It introduced the pick 10 system in create-a-class, which offered greater player freedom and customization, and scorestreaks (replacing killstreaks); these features would remain in subsequent games. Its maps have been called some of the series' finest, while the addition of ranked play allowed for competitive gameplay styles that previous entries lacked. Complex's Dan Wenerowicz described the mode as "the best balance of competitive play we’ve seen in the series". Critics have also praised the Zombies mode for its maps, particularly "Mob of the Dead". Cade Onder of ComicBook.com calls Black Ops II "one of the best shooters of its time" and believes "there is a reason" fans have requested a remaster in the years following its release. NME's staff called Black Ops II the last "phenomenal" Call of Duty game before Modern Warfare in 2019.
