= Chinese stock exchanges =

Chinese Stock Exchanges may refer to:

People's Republic of China

- Beijing Stock Exchange
- Shanghai Stock Exchange
- Shenzhen Stock Exchange
- Hong Kong Stock Exchange

Republic of China

- Taiwan Stock Exchange
