= Call of Duty 2: Big Red One =

2005 video game

- North American PlayStation 2 cover art
- Developers: Treyarch; High Voltage Software (GC)
- Publisher: Activision
- Producers: Pat Dwyer; Sam Nouriani
- Designers: Christian Busic; Richard Farrelly; Dan Koppel
- Programmer: Mike Anthony
- Artist: Alex Bortoluzzi
- Writers: Aaron Ginsburg; Wade McIntyre
- Composer: Graeme Revell
- Series: Call of Duty
- Engine: Treyarch NGL
- Platforms: GameCube, PlayStation 2, Xbox
- Release: NA: November 1, 2005; EU: November 18, 2005
- Genre: First-person shooter
- Modes: Single-player, multiplayer

Call of Duty 2: Big Red One is a first-person shooter video game developed by Treyarch and published by Activision for GameCube, PlayStation 2 and Xbox. It is a side-story of the original game Call of Duty 2, which was released on PC and Xbox 360. Both were released in 2005.

Big Red One differs from other games in the Call of Duty franchise in that it focuses on a single Allied formation in World War II: the U.S. Army's 1st Infantry Division, which goes by the nickname Big Red One due to their unit patch which features a large, red number one. The game covers the division's part in the North Africa campaign, the invasion of Sicily, the landing on Omaha Beach in Europe and moving east, and eventually crossing the Siegfried Line into Germany. Each chapter is book-ended with period footage from the Military Channel, with voiceovers courtesy of Mark Hamill (who appeared in the Sam Fuller film The Big Red One), imitating a World War II documentary.

The game also features a number of actors from the Emmy- and Golden Globe-winning 2001 HBO miniseries Band of Brothers, based on Stephen E. Ambrose's book of the same name about E (Easy) Company, 2nd Battalion, 506th Parachute Infantry Regiment of the 101st Airborne Division, as voice actors. They include Michael Cudlitz (Sgt. Denver "Bull" Randleman), James Madio (T-4 Frank Perconte), Frank John Hughes (Sgt. William "Wild Bill" Guarnere), Richard Speight Jr. (Sgt. Warren "Skip" Muck), Ross McCall (T-5 Joseph Liebgott), Rick Gomez (T-4 George Luz), and Rene L. Moreno (T-5 Joseph Ramirez). The box cover features actor Stephen Saux. The story and characters were written by Aaron Ginsburg and Wade McIntyre.

In North America, it was later released as part of a compilation pack entitled Call of Duty: Legacy for the PlayStation 2 only. The pack included Call of Duty: Finest Hour and Big Red One. A Collector's Edition was also released for both the Xbox and PlayStation 2.

== Gameplay ==
Call of Duty 2: Big Red One is a first-person shooter that has a single-player story mode and a multiplayer mode. The player takes on the role of a soldier protagonist named Roland Roger in specific missions during World War II from the perspective of the American 1st Infantry Division. The player can crouch and lie prone, and is able to scale low walls and other obstacles. Two firearms can be carried, which can be swapped with those left on the battlefield, and both fragmentation and smoke grenades can also be carried. A gun's iron sights can be used to aim more accurately. A compass on the heads-up display (HUD) shows both allies and enemies and objective markers to indicate locations the player must reach, areas to defend, or enemy cannons or tanks that the player must plant explosives on to disable. Emplaced weapons such as machine guns and flak cannons are available in some locations to take out enemy forces. In addition, some missions place the player in control of a tank. In one mission, the player assumes the role of Roger's brother "Stretch", a crewman on a United States Army Air Forces B-24 Liberator, and acts as a bombardier and gunner.

== Multiplayer ==
Call of Duty 2: Big Red One features a wide range of multiplayer modes for players to participate in – allowing up to 16 on the PlayStation 2 and Xbox in a single match. Various game modes such as capture the flag and deathmatch are supported In line with other online-enabled games on the Xbox, multiplayer on Xbox Live was available to players until April 15, 2010. Call of Duty 2: Big Red One is now playable online again on the replacement Xbox Live servers called Insignia.

== Reception ==
Reception

Aggregate score
| Aggregator | Score |
|---|---|
| Metacritic | XBOX: 78/100; PS2: 77/100; GC: 76/100 |

According to review aggregator Metacritic, the game received "generally favorable" reviews from critics.

During the 9th Annual Interactive Achievement Awards, the Academy of Interactive Arts & Sciences awarded Big Red One with the "Outstanding Achievement in Story and Character Development" award.

The PlayStation 2 version of Big Red One received a "Platinum" sales award from the Entertainment and Leisure Software Publishers Association (ELSPA), indicating sales of at least 300,000 copies in the United Kingdom.
