= Treyarch =

American video game developer

Treyarch Corporation
- Logo used since 2018
- Formerly: Treyarch Invention LLC (1996–2001)
- Type: Subsidiary
- Industry: Video games
- Founded: 1996; 30 years ago
- Founders: Peter Akemann; Doğan Köslü
- Headquarters: Playa Vista, Los Angeles, California, US
- Number of locations: 3 (2024)
- Key people: Kevin Hendrickson (co-studio head); Yale Miller (co-studio head); Corky Lehmkuhl (creative director)
- Products: Call of Duty series (2005–present)
- Number of employees: 300 (2012)
- Parent: Activision (2001–present)
- Divisions: Treyarch Vancouver; Treyarch Austin
- Website: treyarch.com

Treyarch Corporation (/ˈtreɪɑːrk/ TRAY-ark; formerly Treyarch Invention LLC) is an American video game developer based in Los Angeles with additional studio locations in Vancouver, Canada; and Austin, Texas. Founded in 1996 by Peter Akemann and Doğan Köslü, it was acquired by Activision in 2001. The studio is known for the Call of Duty series, which it develops alongside Infinity Ward, Sledgehammer Games, and Raven Software.

== History ==
Treyarch was founded in 1996 as Treyarch Inventions and was acquired by Activision in 2001. In 2005, Gray Matter Studios was merged into Treyarch. As part of the 2007 Leipzig Games Convention, Activision announced that Treyarch would be one of three developers behind its first James Bond-based game, 007: Quantum of Solace. The game was released on October 31, 2008, in Europe and November 4, 2008, in North America. Vicarious Visions developed the Nintendo DS version and Eurocom developed the PlayStation 2 version.

Treyarch is a major developer in the Call of Duty franchise, having first worked on Call of Duty 2: Big Red One in 2005. The studio is known for creating the Black Ops sub-series. Call of Duty: Black Ops broke entertainment launch records in November 2010 by generating $360 million in its first 24 hours and selling 5.6 million copies. It reached $650 million worldwide within five days, and topped $1 billion in global retail sales within six weeks of its launch. Call of Duty: Black Ops won Best Shooter at the 2010 Spike Video Game Awards. Its sequel, Call of Duty: Black Ops II, earned over $500 million in its first 24 hours, and sold over $1 billion after 15 days. Call of Duty: Black Ops III earned over $550 million in three days, and is the best-selling Call of Duty game of all time with over 43 million copies sold.

Fellow Call of Duty developer Sledgehammer Games was originally slated to lead the development of the 2020 entry but encountered internal tensions and creative differences with co-developer Raven Software. This led to publisher Activision tapping Treyarch to take over from Sledgehammer Games as co-developer for the game alongside Raven Software. This entry was later revealed to be Call of Duty: Black Ops Cold War. Raven Software handled the game's campaign, while Treyarch led the development of the multiplayer and Zombies mode. Call of Duty: Black Ops Cold War set a new global franchise sales record for most digital units sold on launch day. Treyarch would continue its collaboration with Raven Software for Call of Duty: Black Ops 6 (2024), and Call of Duty: Black Ops 7 (2025).

Dan Bunting, who had been co-lead of Treyarch since around 2003, was named in an investigative report by The Wall Street Journal related to the lawsuit filed against Activision Blizzard by the state of California over workplace misconduct and discrimination. Bunting had reportedly mistreated an employee in 2017, but was kept on by Activision Blizzard's CEO, Bobby Kotick. After The Wall Street Journal began its investigation, Bunting was let go. On August 18, 2023, studio design director David Vonderhaar announced he would be leaving the studio after 18 years.

Aside from being a primary developer for the Call of Duty series, Treyarch also acts as a support studio. Treyarch assisted fellow Call of Duty developer Infinity Ward by working on the Wii version of Call of Duty: Modern Warfare 3 in 2011 and the Wii U version of Call of Duty: Ghosts in 2013.

== Game engines ==
Treyarch developed an in-house engine named Treyarch NGL, based on id Software's id Tech 3. Treyarch NGL was used for Call of Duty 2: Big Red One (2005) and Call of Duty 3 (2006). Beginning in 2008, Treyarch uses fellow Call of Duty developer Infinity Ward's game engine called the IW engine, which is also based on id Tech 3. The studio used IW 3.0 for 007: Quantum of Solace (2008), Call of Duty: World at War (2008), Call of Duty: Black Ops (2010), and Call of Duty: Black Ops II (2012).

With the introduction of the eighth generation of video game consoles, Treyarch heavily modified and upgraded the engine for Call of Duty: Black Ops III in 2015. Call of Duty: Black Ops 4 in 2018 features a new 'Super Terrain' system and can accommodate up to 100 players. Treyarch heavily upgraded the engine for Call of Duty: Black Ops Cold War in 2020, coinciding with the release of the ninth generation of video game consoles.

With Call of Duty: Modern Warfare II in 2022, Treyarch co-developed the engine with Infinity Ward and Sledgehammer Games to be used in future installments of the series in a unified effort to ensure that every studio is working with the same tools. With the new shared engine dubbed IW 9.0, Treyarch was able to introduce a new movement system called 'Omnimovement', auto-mantling for faster navigation, and highly customizable HUD for Call of Duty: Black Ops 6 in 2024. Call of Duty: Black Ops 6 also featured audio improvements and upgrades. This engine is also used in Call of Duty: Black Ops 7 the following year.

== Games developed ==
Year	Game	Platform(s)	Note(s)
1998	Olympic Hockey '98	Nintendo 64	
1998	Die by the Sword	Windows	
1998	Die by the Sword: Limb from Limb	Windows	
1999	Triple Play 2000	Nintendo 64	
2000	Draconus: Cult of the Wyrm	Dreamcast	
2000	Triple Play 2001	PlayStation	
2000	Max Steel: Covert Missions	Dreamcast	
2001	Triple Play Baseball	Windows, PlayStation, PlayStation 2	
2001	Tony Hawk's Pro Skater 2x	Xbox	Co-developed with Neversoft
2002	NHL 2K2	Dreamcast	
2002	Spider-Man	GameCube, PlayStation 2, Xbox, Windows	
2002	Kelly Slater's Pro Surfer	GameCube, PlayStation 2, Xbox, Windows, macOS	
2002	NHL 2K3	GameCube, PlayStation 2, Xbox	
2002	Minority Report: Everybody Runs	PlayStation 2, Xbox, GameCube	
2004	Spider-Man 2	PlayStation 2, Xbox, GameCube	
2005	Ultimate Spider-Man	Windows, PlayStation 2, Xbox, GameCube	
2005	Call of Duty 2: Big Red One	PlayStation 2, Xbox, GameCube	
2006	Call of Duty 3	PlayStation 2, PlayStation 3, Xbox, Xbox 360	
2007	Spider-Man 3	PlayStation 3, Xbox 360, Windows	
2008	Spider-Man: Web of Shadows	Windows, PlayStation 3, Wii, Xbox 360	Co-developed with Shaba Games
2008	007: Quantum of Solace	Windows, PlayStation 3, Wii, Xbox 360	
2008	Call of Duty: World at War	Windows, PlayStation 3, Wii, Xbox 360	Wii version co-developed by Exakt Entertainment
2010	Call of Duty: Black Ops	Windows, Wii, Xbox 360, PlayStation 3, PlayStation 4, PlayStation 5	
2012	Call of Duty: Black Ops II	Windows, Wii U, Xbox 360, PlayStation 3, PlayStation 4, PlayStation 5	
2015	Call of Duty: Black Ops III	Windows, PlayStation 4, Xbox One	
2018	Call of Duty: Black Ops 4	Windows, PlayStation 4, Xbox One	
2020	Call of Duty: Black Ops Cold War	Windows, PlayStation 4, PlayStation 5, Xbox One, Xbox Series X/S	Co-developed with Raven Software, worked on multiplayer and Zombies modes
2021	Call of Duty: Vanguard	Windows, PlayStation 4, PlayStation 5, Xbox One, Xbox Series X/S	Zombies and Ranked Play modes
2022	Call of Duty: Modern Warfare II	Windows, PlayStation 4, PlayStation 5, Xbox One, Xbox Series X/S	Ranked Play mode
2022	Call of Duty: Warzone 2.0	Windows, PlayStation 4, PlayStation 5, Xbox One, Xbox Series X/S	Ranked Play mode
2023	Call of Duty: Modern Warfare III	Windows, PlayStation 4, PlayStation 5, Xbox One, Xbox Series X/S	Zombies and Ranked Play modes, assisted Sledgehammer Games
2024	Call of Duty: Black Ops 6	Windows, PlayStation 4, PlayStation 5, Xbox One, Xbox Series X/S	Co-developed with Raven Software, worked on multiplayer and Zombies modes
2025	Call of Duty: Black Ops 7	Windows, PlayStation 4, PlayStation 5, Xbox One, Xbox Series X/S	Co-developed with Raven Software
2026	Call of Duty: Modern Warfare 4	Microsoft Windows, Nintendo Switch 2, PlayStation 5, Xbox Series X and Series S	Developed Ranked Play mode in collaboration with Infinity Ward

=== Ports developed ===
Year	Game	Platform(s)	Developer(s)
2000	Tony Hawk's Pro Skater	Dreamcast	Neversoft
2000	Tony Hawk's Pro Skater 2	Dreamcast	Neversoft
2001	Spider-Man	Dreamcast	Neversoft
2009	Call of Duty: Modern Warfare: Reflex	Wii	Infinity Ward
2011	Call of Duty: Modern Warfare 3	Wii	Infinity Ward
2013	Call of Duty: Ghosts	Wii U	Infinity Ward
