= Barrage (video game) =

1998 video game

- Developer: Mango Grits
- Publisher: Activision
- Platform: Microsoft Windows
- Release: NA: 8 October 1998; EU: 1998
- Genre: First-person shooter

Barrage is a video game developed by American studio Mango Grits and published by Activision for Microsoft Windows in 1998. Published by Zoo in the territory of Japan.

== Reception ==
Reception

Aggregate score
Aggregator	Score
GameRankings	50%

Review scores
Publication	Score
AllGame	2/5
Computer Games Strategy Plus	1.5/5
Computer Gaming World	2/5
GamePro	3.5/5
GameRevolution	D−
GameSpot	6/10
IGN	3.7/10
Next Generation	3/5
PC Accelerator	6/10
PC Gamer (US)	34%
PC Zone	70%

The game received mixed reviews according to the review aggregation website GameRankings. Next Generation said, "As a generic shooter, Barrage is fun, but it won't win any awards. It is, however, relatively inexpensive at $29.99, and that may be its saving grace."
