= Call of Duty: World at War (disambiguation) =

Call of Duty: World at War is a video game on several platforms:

- Call of Duty: World at War for the PC, PlayStation 3, Wii and Xbox 360
- Call of Duty: World at War – Zombies for the iPhone
- Call of Duty: World at War – Final Fronts for the PlayStation 2
- Call of Duty: World at War (Nintendo DS) for the Nintendo DS
