= Call of Duty: Black Ops 6 Zombies =

2024 video game

- Developer: Treyarch
- Publisher: Activision
- Designer: Kevin Drew
- Writers: Craig Houston; Dan Laufer
- Composer: Brian Tuey
- Series: Call of Duty
- Platforms: PlayStation 4; PlayStation 5; Windows; Xbox One; Xbox Series X/S
- Release: October 25, 2024
- Genre: First/third-person shooter
- Modes: Single-player, multiplayer

Call of Duty: Black Ops 6 Zombies is a 2024 cooperative video game developed by Treyarch and published by Activision. Set in February 1991, the game's story follows the senior staff members of the former CIA group "Requiem" directly after the events of Call of Duty: Black Ops Cold War (2020). It was released as part of Call of Duty: Black Ops 6 on October 25, 2024, for PlayStation 4, PlayStation 5, Windows, Xbox One, and Xbox Series X/S.

As with most previous iterations of Call of Duty's Zombies mode, Black Ops 6 Zombies—playable from either a first-person or third-person perspective—tasks players with combating endless hordes of zombies that increase in both number and difficulty with every round. The mode features six main maps, each of which features a main quest for players to pursue, along with a number of side quests and Easter eggs. Like the core game, it features an omnidirectional movement system, allowing players to sprint, dive, and slide in any direction.

While developing Black Ops 6 Zombies, Treyarch sought to refine what they established with Black Ops Cold War, introduce new elements to the mode, re-add old aspects from previous games, and make it more approachable for new players. Marketing for the mode began in June 2024 during the 2024 Xbox Games Showcase event; a full reveal debuted in August. Upon release, Black Ops 6 Zombies received positive reviews from critics, who praised its core gameplay format, movement system, and its launch maps. A continuation of its story is featured in the Zombies mode for Call of Duty: Black Ops 7 (2025).

== Gameplay ==
As with previous Call of Duty Zombies modes, players can use special "wonder weapons" to combat the undead.

Call of Duty: Black Ops 6 Zombies is a cooperative game played from either a first-person or third-person perspective. Like previous versions of Call of Duty's Zombies mode, players use a selection of military equipment, such as weapons, "field upgrades", and special "wonder weapons", to combat endless hordes of zombies, which increase in both number and difficulty with every completed round. Up to four players can play together in a match; solo matches are also available, with the ability for players to pause and save their progress in them. As with the core game, the mode features an omnidirectional movement system, allowing players to sprint, dive, and slide in any direction.

Black Ops 6 Zombies features six playable maps, "Liberty Falls", "Terminus", "Citadelle des Morts", "The Tomb", "Shattered Veil", and "Reckoning", which directly continue the mode's storyline following the events of Call of Duty: Black Ops Cold War (2020). Each map includes a main quest that players must solve without any guidance, which typically culminates in a boss fight. A number of side quests and Easter eggs are also featured on Black Ops 6 Zombies' maps, which require additional steps to complete; for example, collecting several mini-statues of a superhero on Liberty Falls allows players to temporarily transform into said superhero. Two additional game modes—"Directed" and "Grief"—were added to all maps post-launch; the former allows players to complete main quests with in-game assistance, while the latter pits two teams of four players against one another as they attempt to survive the undead, while hindering the enemy team indirectly via debuffs.

Prior to starting a match, players can select and customize a primary loadout weapon, a dedicated melee weapon, and a field upgrade; they can also acquire additional weapons via a map's "wall buys" or obtain a randomly chosen weapon from a "mystery box". Players can also choose their desired character from a selection of four "dedicated crew" members—Grigori Weaver, Elizabeth Grey, Mackenzie "Mac" Carver, and Maya Aguinaldo; alternatively, they can play as any character from Black Ops 6's multiplayer component. While in a match, players have two main currencies to manage: "Essence" and "Salvage". Both currencies are obtained from killing zombies; Essence is used to unlock access to new parts of the maps, acquire weapon upgrades from the "Pack-a-Punch" machine, and to purchase additional player upgrades, including "Perk-a-Cola" cans and armor vests, while Salvage is used to acquire ammo modifications for the player's weapons, increase a weapon's damage tier, and to craft various pieces of lethal and tactical equipment. Players can also earn "GobbleGums"—single-use consumables that grant various in-game effects—and unlock "Augments", a set of minor and major upgrades to perks, field upgrades and ammo mods. Each perk, field upgrade, and ammo mod features up to three minor and major Augments, with one of each type being equipable at the same time, allowing players to customize and experiment with different play styles.

== Plot ==
In February 1991, a zombie incursion from the "Dark Aether" dimension occurs at the West Virginian town of Liberty Falls, during which the Director of the former CIA group "Requiem" and the classified operation "Project Janus", Edward Richtofen (Nolan North), goes missing. Meanwhile, former KGB scientist Dr. William Peck and smuggler Maya Aguinaldo (Chantelle Barry) free Requiem's senior staff—Special Officer Grigori Weaver (Gene Farber), Drs. Elizabeth Grey (Abigail Marlowe) and Oskar Strauss (Jeremy Crutchley), Major Mackenzie Carver (Keston John), and Captain Stoney "Raptor One" Maddox (Derek Phillips)—from their imprisonment at Terminus Island, a remote Project Janus research facility in the Philippine Sea. (Note: As depicted in Black Ops Cold War (2020)) Peck proposes they hunt down Richtofen, while Maya seeks to rescue her brother Nathan, who is also imprisoned at Terminus. A second breach occurs simultaneously with the one at Liberty Falls, forcing Requiem to fend off zombies. The group locates and kills a mutated Nathan, then establishes communications with the Synaptic Algorithm Module (S.A.M.), an AI system designed by Richtofen based on the personality of Requiem ally Samantha Maxis, who trapped herself in the Dark Aether to help Requiem contain "the Forsaken", an entity responsible for various incursions in the 1980s; with S.A.M.'s help, the team neutralizes Terminus's head scientist, Revati Modi.

S.A.M. reveals that Richtofen hired the French Syndicate, a crime family based in the Mediterranean principality of Avalon, to locate the "Sentinel Artifact", an object of power that controls a primordial substance, known as "Prima Materia"; she also says that the Syndicate hired former Requiem informant Sergei Ravenov (Andrew Morgado) to abduct demonologist Gabriel Krafft. Believing the Artifact can free Maxis from the Dark Aether, the team travels to an Avalonian village, where they find Ravenov, who still mourns the loss of Maxis. Ravenov reveals that the Syndicate interrogated Krafft for information, but he refused to speak. As a new outbreak occurs, Requiem enters a nearby castle and finds Krafft imprisoned within its dungeon; Maya also finds and kills the Syndicate's leader, François "Franco" Moreau, who smuggled Nathan to Terminus. With Krafft's assistance, the team recovers the "Obscurus Altilium", an amulet that can help them obtain the Artifact, but fails to save Krafft from succumbing to the zombies. In his dying breath, Krafft directs the group to a nearby excavation site and begs them not to kill Richtofen, who he reveals to be his adopted son.

At the excavation site, Requiem uses the amulet to enter a "Dark Aether Nexus", where they complete a series of trials to acquire the Artifact. At S.A.M.'s behest, Requiem arrives at Richtofen's mansion in Liberty Falls, where they perform rituals to power up the Artifact; after giving her the charged Artifact, S.A.M. teleports the team to a room where Richtofen is imprisoned. Richtofen confronts Weaver, revealing that he sought the Artifact to resurrect his wife and son, who died in a failed assassination hit on him in 1981—carried out by Weaver and Maxis—and that he hand-picked Weaver for Requiem to keep him in check. After forming a truce with Richtofen and escaping the mansion via a device in the latter's possession, Requiem learns that S.A.M. intends to use the Artifact to reconstitute and inhabit Maxis' body, which Richtofen claims would give her "God-like power" and full control over the Dark Aether.

The group heads toward "Janus Towers", Project Janus' headquarters, where Richtofen attempts to confront S.A.M., while Requiem stabilizes the facility's Aether reactors. As they navigate Janus Towers, S.A.M. contacts Requiem, claiming that Maxis was consumed by the Dark Aether prior to their escape and imploring them to allow her—the sole remnant of their ally—to recreate Maxis' body and live a human life, something that Richtofen had repeatedly denied her; Requiem also encounters the Forsaken, who tries, but fails, to escape his containment chamber following a power surge. Requiem regains access to the Artifact and is faced with a decision: to help Richtofen resurrect his family, or to help S.A.M. create a human body; either choice results in the other becoming hostile. Regardless of the choice, Requiem emerges triumphant, but is teleported by the Artifact into the Dark Aether, where they encounter an alternate version of Richtofen and his three companions: "Tank" Dempsey, Nikolai Belinski, and Takeo Masaki.

== Development and release ==
Black Ops 6 Zombies was developed by Treyarch as a core component of Call of Duty: Black Ops 6 (2024). Associate design director Kevin Drew described it as a refinement of what the studio established with Call of Duty: Black Ops Cold War (2020), while also introducing both new elements to the mode and aspects from previous games. Drew felt it was important to add certain elements that the team was not able to bring to Black Ops Cold War due to development challenges, such as the COVID-19 pandemic; one of these things was a set playable crew that evolves throughout the game's narrative via cinematics and "emergent" gameplay moments. He also wanted to "bring Zombies to more people" by making it more approachable for new players and enabling them to reach higher rounds. Brian Tuey wrote the mode's score, while Kevin Sherwood composed original songs for every Black Ops 6 Zombies map, which are hidden as Easter eggs within the maps.

Amidst the then-ongoing SAG-AFTRA video game strike, players noticed that Activision had recast some voice actors from previous Zombies modes for Black Ops 6 Zombies without a public announcement, including Zeke Alton and Julie Nathanson, who respectively voiced the characters William Peck and Samantha Maxis. Alton and Activision acknowledged the recasting via statements to Game Developer; Alton expressed he "absolutely adore[d] the creative team and the opportunity [he] had to collaborate with them in the past", and that he "hope[d] to collaborate in the future once all performers are protected against generative AI abuse", while Activision said they respected the "personal choice" of the actors and that they were "look[ing] forward to a mutually beneficial outcome as soon as possible." Journalists noted that Black Ops 6 was not a struck production, due to it entering development prior to the beginning of the strike; some speculated that the actors opted not to sign new contracts in solidarity with striking union members.

The mode was released alongside Black Ops 6 on October 25, 2024, for PlayStation 4, PlayStation 5, Windows, Xbox One, and Xbox Series X/S. It was made available to subscribers of select Xbox Game Pass plans on release day, including Xbox Game Pass Ultimate, PC Game Pass and Xbox Game Pass for Console; it is also available via select cloud gaming platforms, including GeForce Now and Xbox Cloud Gaming. Post-release, Treyarch supported Black Ops 6 Zombies with seasonal updates, which added new playable content to the mode, such as maps, perks, limited-time modes, and in-game events. A continuation of its story is featured in the Zombies mode for Call of Duty: Black Ops 7 (2025).

=== Promotion ===
Activision and Microsoft revealed initial details about Black Ops 6 Zombies during a "Direct" presentation for Black Ops 6, which aired as part of the 2024 Xbox Games Showcase event on June 9. Following the publishing of teasers on a website titled "The Truth Dies", and a cinematic trailer for the map "Terminus", a gameplay trailer was released on August 8, along with a blog post outlining the mode's core gameplay systems. Further details about Black Ops 6 Zombies and gameplay footage from the "Liberty Falls" map were revealed at the 2024 Call of Duty: Next showcase event on August 28; following fan feedback regarding Liberty Falls' visual presentation, Treyarch made adjustments to its look, feel, and sound in order to "crank up the map's creepiness factor."

== Reception ==
Reception

Review scores
Publication	Score
GameSpot	8/10
IGN	8/10

Black Ops 6 Zombies received positive reviews from critics, as did the core game. IGN's Will Borger wrote that the mode was "absurd and campy and amazing and goofy in all the right ways". The Guardian's Keith Stuart noted that Black Ops 6 Zombies was "fraught and incredibly stressful" but said it was "a real blast" with friends. GamesRadar+'s Andrew Brown felt that Black Ops 6's version of Call of Duty's Zombies mode revitalized his love for it as a whole. Multiple outlets appreciated Black Ops 6 Zombies' round-based gameplay format, as opposed to the mode's open world design in Black Ops 6's direct predecessor, Call of Duty: Modern Warfare III (2023).

Critics liked the design of Black Ops 6 Zombies' launch maps, "Terminus" and "Liberty Falls". GamesRadar+'s Brown described Liberty Falls as a "bridge between the original maps of World at War and Black Ops, and the larger settings used from Black Ops 2 onward", and noted an "old-school" layout design for Terminus, "beginning in a single hall before branching out in a web of small, oppressive hallways and rooms." IGN's Borger expressed a preference for Liberty Falls due to its "more open areas" and "unique travel options". Hardcore Gamer's Kevin Dunsmore felt the mode's "smart" map design created "a thrilling experience".

VG247's Fran Ruiz felt Black Ops 6 Zombies "greatly benefit[s]" from the core game's new omnidirectional movement system. IGN's Borger thought the movement "fe[lt] good" but expected that players wouldn't use it "all of the time, especially as the zombies get more numerous in the later rounds." GameSpot's Phil Hornshaw asserted that the movement's agility added "an extra dynamism to Zombies".
