= Call of Duty: Black Ops 7 =

2025 video game

- Developers: Treyarch; Raven Software (Note: Windows version led by Beenox. Additional development by Activision Central Design, Activision Central Technology, Activision Shanghai, Beenox, Demonware, Digital Legends, High Moon Studios, Infinity Ward, and Sledgehammer Games.)
- Publisher: Activision
- Directors: Jon Zuk; Miles Leslie
- Producer: Natalie Pohorski
- Designers: Matt Scronce; Kevin Drew
- Artist: Wil Wells
- Writer: Dan Laufer
- Composer: Jack Wall
- Series: Call of Duty
- Platforms: PlayStation 4; PlayStation 5; Windows; Xbox One; Xbox Series X/S
- Release: November 14, 2025
- Genre: First-person shooter
- Modes: Single-player, multiplayer

Call of Duty: Black Ops 7 is a 2025 first-person shooter video game co-developed by Treyarch and Raven Software and published by Activision. It is the twenty-second main installment of the Call of Duty series and is the eighth entry in the Black Ops sub-series, following Call of Duty: Black Ops 6 (2024). Set in 2035, Black Ops 7's story—playable in co-op or single-player—follows a JSOC unit led by David Mason as they investigate the apparent return of deceased terrorist Raul Menendez. As with previous Call of Duty titles, the game also includes a multiplayer component and the cooperative round-based Zombies mode.

Development on Black Ops 7 took place concurrently with the production of Black Ops 6, with both games being green-lit at the same time. Marketing for the title began in June 2025 with the release of a cinematic trailer during the 2025 Xbox Games Showcase event; a full reveal debuted on August 19, at Gamescom. Black Ops 7 was released on November 14, 2025, for PlayStation 4, PlayStation 5, Windows, Xbox One, and Xbox Series X/S. It received mixed reviews from critics and a negative response from players, with the game being the subject of review bombing on Metacritic. The title ranked as the fifth best-selling game in the United States for 2025, the lowest end-of-year ranking for a Call of Duty release since 2008.

== Gameplay ==
In Black Ops 7, players can perform "wall jumps" while they are traversing its levels/maps.

Call of Duty: Black Ops 7, like its predecessor, Black Ops 6, is a first-person shooter. Depending on the game mode selected, players use near-future military equipment, such as weapons, "field upgrades", and "scorestreaks", to combat AI opponents, other human players, or undead creatures. Players can traverse a level/map omnidirectionally, and can perform "wall jumps" while traversing them; in a change from Black Ops 6, the "Tactical Sprint" ability, which grants a limited boost of speed allowing faster movement than the regular sprint, has been removed from the core movement, but is accessible as an in-game perk.

Black Ops 7 features three main game modes: a co-op/single-player campaign, a multiplayer component and the cooperative round-based Zombies mode. Playable with up to four players, the campaign sees players take control of a JSOC unit as they undertake a covert operation in the Mediterranean city of Avalon. The campaign features 11 total missions; completing all missions unlocks access to the "Endgame" mode, (Note: An update in mid-to-late November 2025 unlocked access to Endgame for all players, regardless if they have completed the campaign.) which puts up to 32 players in Avalon and tasks them with completing a series of objectives within a strict time limit. Players can bring a custom loadout with them into Endgame, and can equip their selected character with a major and minor ability to enhance their capabilities before starting each match, but if they die, they lose access to their gear; a skill tree is also available to progress in-match, which grants additional buffs, and can be retained between successful exfiltrations.

The multiplayer component puts two opposing teams of six (6v6)—"JSOC" and "The Guild"—against each other across a wide selection of game modes, such as Team Deathmatch, Domination, Hardpoint, and Overload; an exception to this is "Skirmish", an objective-based mode that allows for 20v20 combat. Like previous Call of Duty titles, player performance is tracked with experience points (XP), which can be earned by killing enemy players, completing objectives, or finishing challenges; XP can also be earned in the campaign and Zombies modes. As players level up, they gain access to various loadout items, including new weapons, pieces of equipment, and perks, the latter of which are split into three "combat specialties" that are activated when selecting three perks of the same specialty; new to Black Ops 7 are "hybrid combat specialties", which grant buffs when mixing perks from two different combat specialties. Players can also apply additional "overclocks" to their selection of lethal and tactical equipment, scorestreaks, and field upgrades. Once players reach level 55, they can choose to enter the "Prestige" ranking system, which resets their progress back to level 1 but grants a set of additional rewards; this process can be done up to ten times. Fully leveled up weapons can also be Prestiged, which unlocks a unique weapon attachment and camo, but re-locks all base attachments.

In Zombies, up to four players fight hordes of the undead, which increase in difficulty with every completed round, across six maps, which continue the mode's storyline directly following the events of Black Ops 6 Zombies. The standard Zombies experience shares several gameplay features with Black Ops 6 Zombies: players manage two primary currencies, "Essence" and "Salvage", which are used to unlock new parts of the maps, acquire weapon upgrades and ammo modifications, craft pieces of lethal and tactical equipment, and to purchase player upgrades, including "Perk-a-Colas" and armor vests; players can also apply minor and major "augments" to perks, field upgrades and ammo mods, and consume "GobbleGums"—single-use items that grant various in-game effects. Black Ops 6's "Directed" mode also returns, allowing players to complete a map's main quest with in-game assistance. Supplementing the standard and Directed modes are three new game modes: "Survival", "Dead Ops Arcade 4", and "Cursed". Survival tasks players with surviving for as long as possible on small sections of the core maps. Dead Ops Arcade 4 is a new iteration of the top-down shooter included in several previous Black Ops titles. Cursed is an advanced version of Zombies, featuring additional difficulty modifiers called "Relics" and legacy elements from older Call of Duty games.

== Plot ==
=== Campaign ===
In June 2035, ten years after JSOC Commander David "Section" Mason (Milo Ventimiglia) stopped a plot by the terrorist organization "Cordis Die" to hijack the United States's drone fleet and neutralized its leader, Raul Menendez (Jesse Corti), (Note: As depicted in Call of Duty: Black Ops II (2012)) a video of Menendez surfaces online, which claims the 2025 attacks were "just the beginning" and that he plans to take his next steps in three days; in response, "the Guild"—a tech giant led by its CEO, Emma Kagan (Kiernan Shipka)—vows to defend humanity. Doubting their true intentions, Colonel Troy Marshall (Y'lan Noel) deploys David and his unit, "Specter One", which comprises fellow operatives Mike Harper (Michael Rooker), Eric Samuels (John Eric Bentley), and Leilani "50/50" Tupuola (Frankie Adams), to the Mediterranean city-state of Avalon, where the Guild is based, to investigate the matter. After infiltrating a laboratory, Specter One is ambushed and exposed to a hallucinogenic toxin, causing them to experience vivid hallucinations; the team's survival is enabled by their cybernetic enhancements to their brains and bodies. As Specter One attempts to escape the facility, they become trapped in a vision of Nicaragua, where David confronts an apparition of Menendez. During their escape, Specter One recovers a quantum computer drive, then destroys the laboratory, causing the toxin to escape containment, contaminating Avalon and forcing a mass evacuation of its civilians.

Seeking intel on the toxin, the team meets with JSOC operative Chloe "Karma" Lynch (Erin Cahill), who helps them track down an insider still in Avalon. The team experiences another hallucination, which shows them David's deceased mentor Frank Woods (Damon Victor Allen), who expresses emotional trauma from his imprisonment and torture by Menendez in Angola, as well as his accidental killing of David's father, Alex Mason (Chris Payne Gilbert), culminating in a battle against a hallucination of Woods, corrupted into a gigantic plant monster. After defeating it, David forgives Woods for his mistake, and Woods similarly encourages David to heal from his past traumas. Recovering from the hallucination, Specter One learns from the insider that the toxin is called "the Cradle"; (Note: The same toxin that was originally developed by the paramilitary group "Pantheon" in the 1990s, as depicted in Call of Duty: Black Ops 6 (2024).) Marshall and Karma also inform them that the Menendez video was doctored using deepfake technology by the Guild. Needing a quantum computer to analyze the rest of the drive's data, Specter One captures a server farm to find one, while Marshall sends JSOC unit "Specter Two", led by Slade "Razor" Barrick (Joshua Dov), to a Guild facility in Tokyo to access it. Razor sends what appears to be a decryption key for the drive, but it instead deletes most of the remaining data, revealing that he was a double agent for the Guild.

Specter One experiences further shared hallucinations, based on each member's past traumas. After waking up back in Avalon, they move to capture Dr. Gideon Falkner, a Guild scientist researching the Cradle's effects on the team's cybernetics. He sends them to another Guild building, "the Sanctum", where Kagan ambushes them. Specter One faces a hallucination of Alex, initially depicted as a cruel and controlling warden of Vorkuta, but are able to escape after restoring David and Alex's positive memories. The team learns that Kagan plans to use the Cradle to cause widespread terror, while blaming the fake Menendez and profiting by posing the Guild as heroes. As they attempt to stop Kagan from loading the shipments at Avalon's docks, she sends Razor to confront them, but they manage to kill him. Marshall directs Specter One to a mining rig off the coast of Avalon, where the shipments appear to originate from. Upon investigation, the team discovers a vast underwater manufacturing complex, which they destroy by forcing the bioreactor containing the Cradle to explode; they also capture an unrepentant Kagan to expose her crimes to the world.

Shortly after Kagan's arrest, Kagan's right-hand man, Alden Dorne (Roger Craig Smith), breaks Falkner out of containment. The latter heads to a coastal base near Avalon, intending to unleash the Cradle upon the city once more. Specter One moves to kill Falkner while under heavy influence from the toxin; with his death, the Cradle dissipates from Avalon. Afterwards, Marshall and Karma task Specter One with pursuing Dorne, who is mobilizing the Guild elsewhere.

=== Zombies ===
Immediately after the "Requiem" crew—Grigori Weaver (Gene Farber), Elizabeth Grey (Abigail Marlowe), Mackenzie Carver (Keston John), and Maya Aguinaldo (Chantelle Barry)—is teleported into the "Dark Aether" dimension, (Note: As depicted in Black Ops 6 Zombies (2024)) they are met by an alternate incarnation of their adversary, Edward Richtofen (Nolan North), and his companions: "Tank" Dempsey (Steve Blum), Nikolai Belinski (Fred Tatasciore), and Takeo Masaki (Nelson Lee). Both crews are confronted by a mysterious figure, "the Warden" (Mark Deklin), who drains life essence from them and dispatches zombies; this forces the group to work together to survive. They later meet an entity, who reveals the Warden sought out their essence after they had encounters with ancient powers in their own worlds. It also says that the Warden controls several ancient beings, "Shadowsmiths", who possess the group's essence; by freeing them from the Warden's grasp, the Shadowsmiths would return the essence.

After the first two Shadowsmiths are freed, the Warden captures the entity, revealed to be Ava Jansen (Denise Hoey/Morla Gorrondona), Grey's future surrogate daughter, (Note: As depicted in Call of Duty: Modern Warfare Zombies (2023)) and places the group in a time loop, where they come into contact with two young twin sisters, who claim the Warden is inadvertently "killing reality", and complete trials to escape the loop. The group frees the third Shadowsmith, Dravakar, who tells them that their own actions are causing the Dark Aether to unravel, threatening the existence of every universe. At Dravakar's behest, the group liberates his sister Nyxara, the final Shadowsmith, and retrieves an object called the "World Seed". The twins bait the Warden into using Ava's Dark Aether powers—inherited from her deceased biological mother and Requiem ally Samantha Maxis—to bring the group to his lair, where they use the World Seed to cleanse the Shadowsmiths' "places of power" before confronting and defeating the Warden; with his death, Ava returns Weaver, Grey, and Carver to their world, where they prepare for Ava's future before facing their eventual deaths, while Maya is sent to a world where her brother is still alive. Richtofen and his companions embark on a new path, while Ava and the twins remain in the Dark Aether.

== Development ==
Black Ops 7 was co-developed by Treyarch and Raven Software. Activision Central Design, Activision Central Technology, Activision Shanghai, Beenox, Demonware, Digital Legends, High Moon Studios, Infinity Ward, and Sledgehammer Games provided additional work, with Beenox also leading development on the Windows version. Black Ops 7's production took place concurrently with the one for Call of Duty: Black Ops 6 (2024), with both titles being green-lit simultaneously. Lead narrative producer Natalie Pohorski explained that this approach allowed Treyarch and Raven to more directly build on the foundation set by Black Ops 6 with Black Ops 7. Jack Wall composed the game's score, as he did for Black Ops 6.

As with its predecessor, Black Ops 7 employs the use of generative artificial intelligence for the development of in-game assets. Associate creative director Miles Leslie told IGN that Treyarch aimed to use AI tools as means to assist the development team, and that they "do not replace any of the fantastic team members we have that are doing the final touches and building that content to put it in the game." Yale Miller, Treyarch's director of production, made similar comments to journalists at a pre-release event for Black Ops 7, adding that the team was "still figuring [...] out" AI as a tool; Windows Central's Cole Martin felt Miller "danced around the topic like a pro" and that his body language "[made] it clear this isn't really a topic of discussion he wants to linger on."

== Marketing ==
Activision and Microsoft released a cinematic trailer for Black Ops 7 during the 2025 Xbox Games Showcase event on June 8, and revealed the game's title and story premise; On the same day, Variety shared initial details about the game's cast, including the respective casting of Milo Ventimiglia and Kiernan Shipka as David Mason and Emma Kagan, as well as Michael Rooker's reprisal of his Black Ops II role as Mike Harper. Later in the same month, a teaser was uploaded to the "Cordis Die" YouTube channel, which was used in 2012 to promote Black Ops II. In August, Activision unveiled several live-action teaser trailers featuring the Guild, as well as a viral website for the company. In addition, sponsored articles covering the Guild were published by Forbes and Wired.

The first full reveal for Black Ops 7 took place on August 19, at Gamescom, where developers from Treyarch and Raven shared details on the campaign, narrative, and the "Endgame" activity; a 17-minute "Direct" presentation—containing information about the multiplayer and Zombies modes, as well as additional details on the game's campaign and progression systems—was released alongside the reveal. An accompanying blog post by Activision also stated that select Black Ops 6 content, such as weapons and character skins, would "carry forward" to Black Ops 7. These plans were canceled on August 26 due to community sentiment that Black Ops 6's skin selection, which features crossovers with several media franchises, including Squid Game, Teenage Mutant Ninja Turtles, and Beavis and Butt-Head, had drifted from Call of Duty's visual identity; this was amended on September 10, when Treyarch revealed that a set of four Zombies-specific character skins—unlocked via completing Black Ops 6's main quests—as well as a skin for the operator Samuels, unlocked by reaching Prestige rank 1000 in Black Ops 6, would be available to use in Black Ops 7.

Live gameplay footage of Black Ops 7's multiplayer and Zombies modes was presented at the 2025 Call of Duty: Next event on September 30; ahead of the event, Activision and Treyarch released trailers and blog posts for both modes on September 22 and September 24, respectively.

== Release ==
Black Ops 7 was released on November 14, 2025, for PlayStation 4, PlayStation 5, Windows (via Steam, Battle.net, and the Xbox app), Xbox One, and Xbox Series X/S. It is the final Call of Duty game released on PlayStation 4 and Xbox One; starting with Call of Duty: Modern Warfare 4 (2026), future Call of Duty titles will no longer be published on these platforms. The game was made available to subscribers of select Xbox Game Pass plans on release day, including Xbox Game Pass Ultimate and PC Game Pass. It is also available on select cloud gaming platforms, including GeForce Now and Xbox Cloud Gaming. Black Ops 7's Windows version requires players to enable TPM 2.0 and Secure Boot on their system in order to play; Activision stated that the requirement is in place to "provide the strongest safeguard possible" against cheaters in multiplayer matches.

Those who pre-ordered Black Ops 7 or had an active Xbox Game Pass subscription received early access to an open beta test for the game's multiplayer component and the Zombies "Survival" game mode on October 2, with all players gaining access on October 5; the beta concluded on October 9. Partway through the beta, an "Open Moshpit" playlist was added, which featured a revised matchmaking system with "drastically reduced" skill consideration when searching for matches; due to positive reactions from the Call of Duty community, who were critical of the franchise's use of strict skill-based matchmaking since Call of Duty: Modern Warfare (2019), Activision announced that it would become the default matchmaking system for Black Ops 7's full release. Following the PlayStation 4/5 re-releases of Call of Duty: Black Ops (2010) and Call of Duty: Black Ops II (2012), Activision largely replaced the open matchmaking with a system "inspired by those classic games", intended to improve team balancing, match variety, and to provide a "better experience for mixed-level parties"; the new system was also used for Modern Warfare 4's multiplayer beta.

=== Post-release updates ===
Following the game's release, Treyarch supported Black Ops 7 with seasonal updates, which added new content to the multiplayer, Zombies, and Endgame modes, including new maps, weapons, game modes, premium battle passes, and crossover content, including tie-ins with the Fallout and Doom franchises; the developer dedicated one of the post-launch Zombies maps, "Kowakujō", to Tom Kane, the original voice actor for the character Takeo Masaki, who died in 2026. Six total seasons were released; the first season was released on December 4, 2025, the second on February 5, 2026, the third on April 2, the fourth on June 4, the fifth on July 23, and the sixth and final season on September 17.

== Reception ==
=== Critical reception ===
Reception

Aggregate scores
Aggregator	Score
Metacritic	PS5: 66/100; Win: 65/100; XSXS: 66/100
OpenCritic	36% recommend

Review scores
Publication	Score
Eurogamer	3/5
GameSpot	7/10
Hardcore Gamer	4.5/5
IGN	Campaign: 6/10; Multiplayer: 8/10; Zombies: 6/10
The Guardian	4/5

Black Ops 7 received "mixed or average reviews" from critics, according to the review aggregator website Metacritic. OpenCritic's consensus states that the game is "ambitious yet inconsistent, with strong multiplayer and Zombies modes alongside a divisive mixed co-op campaign", with 36% of critics recommending it.

Reviewers had mixed opinions on Black Ops 7's co-op campaign, with some claiming it was a step backwards from Black Ops 6's single-player campaign. IGN's Simon Cardy gave it a 6/10 rating, writing that it was a "simply okay" mode, which took "some big swings" that did not always land. GameSpot's S.E. Doster felt it had "some successful missions" and "plenty of emotional character moments", but that some aspects of the narrative, such as its plot twists and villain, were "a little underbaked". Conversely, Polygon's Ford James and Pure Xbox's Ben Kerry were much more critical of the campaign, and felt it was a poor outing for the series when compared to previous Call of Duty games. Several outlets noted issues when playing the campaign in single-player, including a lack of AI-controlled companions to assist the player, an absence of mid-mission checkpoints, and the removal of the ability to pause the game when playing solo; Eurogamer's Jeremy Peel stated that playing the campaign in co-op was mandatory for players seeking an optimal experience.

The multiplayer component was met with positive reviews. The Guardian's Keith Stuart wrote that it offered "a lot [...] to enjoy for perennial conscripts of carnage." GameSpot's Doster praised the return of Black Ops 6's omnidirectional movement system and the addition of the wall jump mechanic, which she felt provided "more vertical playing space and more opportunities and angles from which to approach a given situation." Hardcore Gamer's Kevin Dunsmore stated that Black Ops 7 offered a strong selection of 6v6 maps, with a "healthy mix of small, medium and large-sized maps with well-defined lanes". Windows Central's Cole Martin also considered the 6v6 maps to be well-designed, but felt the 20v20 "Skirmish" mode was "surprisingly lacking".

Black Ops 7's Zombies mode received a mostly positive response from critics. Hardcore Gamer's Dunsmore described the mode's launch map, "Ashes of the Damned", as a "massive, sprawling adventure filled with twists and turns". GameSpot's Doster felt "Ashes of the Damned" had a refreshing atmosphere due to the "dark and haunting aesthetic" of the Dark Aether; she also appreciated the inclusion of the "Vandorn Farm" survival map, writing that it was a "great addition to have when Ashes of the Damned feels like too much to handle". Windows Central's Martin considered the top-down "Dead Ops Arcade 4" mode to be a personal highlight. By contrast, Will Borger of IGN felt mixed on Zombies, stating that it is "a shambling corpse that reminds us of the person it used to be".

=== Audience reception ===
Journalists observed a negative player response to Black Ops 7, with the game becoming the subject of review bombing on Metacritic, resulting in a user score of 1.5 at its nadir, the lowest rating for a Call of Duty title on the site. Players were mainly critical of Black Ops 7's co-op campaign, with complaints regarding the game's technical performance, the lack of an ability to pause the game, and its set-pieces, including a boss fight against a giant biomechanical soldier, which was compared to Skibidi Toilet. Players also derided the game's use of generative AI, with a focus on a number of calling cards that players claimed were styled after work by Studio Ghibli; in a statement to multiple media outlets, Activision said that they use AI tools to "empower and support" their teams, and that their creative process "continues to be led by the talented individuals in our studios." U.S. representative Ro Khanna—who has previously expressed a desire for AI regulation in the country—commented on the subject, stating that artists "need to have a say in how AI is deployed." Rhys Elliott, head of market analysis at Alinea Analytics, felt that a lack of innovation within the Call of Duty series and the impact of long-standing player frustrations, including a "focus on heavy microtransactions [...] over core gameplay quality" and the inclusion of "Fortnite-like cosmetic items" contributed to the backlash.

=== Sales and player data ===
According to Circana, Black Ops 7 was the fifth best-selling video game in the United States for 2025, the lowest end-of-year ranking for a Call of Duty game since Call of Duty: World at War (2008). In Europe, Black Ops 7's opening week sales were more than 50% lower than Black Ops 6's launch sales, and 63% lower than the opening week for EA's Battlefield 6. In Japan, the PlayStation 5 version sold 12,311 retail copies, the lowest opening for a Call of Duty title in the country. On Steam, the game's launch weekend peaked at above 100,000 concurrent players, a drop from Black Ops 6's launch weekend, which amassed ~315,000 players. GameSpot's Hayley Williams noted that Activision did not include player statistics on their social media posts celebrating the game's launch weekend, which they did for Black Ops 6 and other preceding Call of Duty games.

== Future ==
Ahead of Black Ops 7's final seasonal update, Treyarch design director Kevin Drew stated in a developer video that the studio has "learned a lot" from the back-to-back releases of Black Ops 6 and Black Ops 7 and was "ready to make something new and something that nobody's ever experienced before"; some journalists interpreted Drew's comment as a sign that Treyarch may be looking to move on from the Black Ops sub-series.
