= Y'lan Noel =

Panamanian-American actor

- Born: New York City, New York, US
- Education: Morehouse College (attended); New York University (BFA)
- Occupation: Actor
- Years active: 2012–present

Y'lan Noel is an American actor. He is known for portraying Daniel King in the HBO television series Insecure (2016–2018), and the lead role of Dmitri Cimber in the horror film The First Purge (2018). He also starred as Coltrane Wilder in the crime drama, Nemesis (2026), and as Ferdie Platt in the Apple TV+ noir thriller series Lady in the Lake (2024). For his role as Troy Marshall in the video game Call of Duty: Black Ops 6, Noel was nominated for the British Academy Games Award for Performer in a Leading Role.

== Early life and education ==
Y'lan Noel was born in Brooklyn, New York. He was further raised in Queens until his family moved to Decatur, Georgia. He is of Afro-Panamanian descent.

He began attending Morehouse College and transferred to New York University. He continued through Tisch School of Arts until he was called away to Los Angeles. He claims that meeting Spike Lee influenced his decision to transfer: "I was at Morehouse College and I remember meeting Spike Lee. At the time, he was teaching at NYU. I was going back and forth about going to New York.... Spike told me to just go for one semester, then I could always come back if I didn’t like it."

== Career ==
Noel landed the role of Daniel King on the 2016 series Insecure. He described Daniel as being the opposite of him: "I was nervous about playing Daniel. I love being around women...but I’ve always felt a bit awkward, well, insecure, around women I’ve had crushes on. Daniel doesn’t seem to have any of that awkwardness... Daniel’s extremely confident and goes after what he wants." Noel also said of Daniel "He only communicates the essence. He's not extremely complex. It makes me really focus on simplicity and how I am effective in this moment".

In 2018, Noel played the lead role of Dmitri in The First Purge, which he considered very challenging: "There is a level of intensity and an amount of focus is needed sometimes that can paralyze you because it is so scary at times. I would have to remove myself from everybody and go back to the trailer and have that sense of peace for a second before I came back out."

Prior to acting in Insecure and The First Purge worked in retail at Brooks Brothers and Tommy Hilfiger to make ends meet.

In 2021, he was cast in the lead for a television pilot based on the Sam Greenlee novel The Spook Who Sat By The Door, to be produced by Lee Daniels.

Noel voiced the role of Troy Marshall in the video game Call of Duty: Black Ops 6. He reprised the role in Call of Duty: Black Ops 7.

In 2024, Noel portrayed Kanye West in the biographical short film Yay.

== Accolades ==
In 2025 Noel was nominated for the British Academy Games Award for Performer in a Leading Role for his role in Call of Duty: Black Ops 6.

== Personal life ==
Noel is a member of Kappa Alpha Psi's Omicron Chapter.

== Filmography ==
=== Film ===
Year	Title	Role	Notes
2012	The Spartan King	Jack	Short film
2013	House of Another	Henry Gibson	
2018	The First Purge	Dmitri	
2018	Slice	Big Cheese	
2018	The Weekend	Aubrey	
2020	The Photograph	Young Isaac Jefferson	
2024	Yay	Ye	Short film

=== Television ===
Year	Title	Role	Notes
2013	The Hustle	Kutta	Main role
2016–2018	Insecure	Daniel King	Recurring (season 1); Main role (season 2–3)
2021	The Spook Who Sat by the Door	Dan Freeman	Main role; unaired pilot
2024	Lady in the Lake	Ferdie Platt	Main role; limited series
2026	Nemesis	Coltrane Wilder	Main role

=== Video games ===
Year	Title	Role	Notes
2024	Call of Duty: Black Ops 6	Troy Marshall	
2025	Call of Duty: Black Ops 7	Troy Marshall	
