= Call of Duty: World at War – Zombies =

2009 video game

- The game's title screen
- Developers: Ideaworks Game Studio, Treyarch
- Publisher: Activision
- Series: Call of Duty
- Platform: iOS
- Release: iPhone; November 16, 2009 iPad; April 1, 2010
- Genre: First-person shooter
- Modes: Single-player, multiplayer

Call of Duty: World at War – Zombies (also known as simply Call of Duty: Zombies) was a first-person shooter video game developed by Ideaworks Game Studio, and published by Activision for iOS. It was a spin-off of the Call of Duty series, and based on the Zombies mode of Call of Duty: World at War. The game was released worldwide for iPhone on November 16, 2009, and for iPad on April 1, 2010. The game allowed for multiplayer cooperative gameplay locally via an ad hoc Wi-Fi or Bluetooth network, or globally via the internet. It also came with the three other maps, Verrückt, Shi No Numa, and Der Riese. A sequel to the game, Call of Duty: Black Ops – Zombies, has been published by Activision.

The game's setting originally takes place in a German bunker (Nacht der Untoten, meaning "Night of the Undead" in German) during World War II from the viewpoint of a US Marine. SS soldiers who have become zombies attempt to infiltrate the bunker and attack the players, and the players must defend themselves in the process.

== Gameplay ==
The objective of the game is to survive each round of invading zombies after which a more difficult round begins. The player begins the game with a Colt 1911 and has access to a melee attack via a combat knife, as well as a maximum of 4 hand grenades. As players fight the zombies, they receive points. These points are used to buy weapons, perks, and access to different parts of the map. Some maps have different variations of zombies that spawn on specific waves, like zombie hell hounds.

Zombies enter from outside the playable map via barricaded entries. As the rounds progress, difficulty increases and the zombies can remove barricades faster. Players are awarded points for replacing barricades as well as killing zombies.

The game has a variety of perks that can be bought with points which award players with enhanced abilities. In addition to perks, there are random instances of power-up drops that are left behind when a zombie is killed to further aid players.

Some maps may also contain 'Easter Eggs' that players can perform to play music, earn some kind of reward, or learn more about the series' cryptic lore.

== Plot ==
No.	Title	Original release date
1	"Nacht der Untoten"	November 11, 2008
After an Allied plane malfunctions over an airfield and crashes, four U.S. Marines escape the wreckage and retreat to a nearby bunker, where they attempt to survive against a horde of zombies.
2	"Verrückt"	March 19, 2009
In September 1945, four U.S. Marines find themselves stranded at the Wittenau Sanatorium in Berlin, where they hold out against the encroaching zombie horde.
3	"Shi No Numa"	June 11, 2009
Doctor Edward Richtofen (Nolan North), U.S. Marine "Tank" Dempsey (Steve Blum), Red Army soldier Nikolai Belinski (Fred Tatasciore), and Imperial Japanese Army soldier Takeo Masaki (Tom Kane), find themselves at an outpost in the middle of a Japanese swamp, where they combat the undead horde, who are revealed to be reanimated via the newly discovered "Element 115".
4	"Der Riese"	August 6, 2009
Richtofen and his allies travel to the Der Riese weapons factory in Breslau, Germany, previously run by the German research organization Group 935, of which Richtofen was a former member. There, Richtofen intends to use the teleporter located in the base to confront Samantha Maxis (Julie Nathanson), a young girl who is seemingly in control of the zombie horde. It is revealed that during an experiment on Samantha's dog, Fluffy, which turned it into a demonic "Hellhound", Richtofen trapped both Samantha and her father Doctor Maxis (Fred Tatasciore) in the teleporter chamber with the Hellhound and transported them to another location.

== Reception ==
Reception

Aggregate score
Aggregator	Score
Metacritic	(iPad) 85/100 (iPhone) 78/100

Review scores
Publication	Score
Destructoid	(iPad) 7.5/10 (iPhone) 7/10
GameSpot	(iPhone) 8/10
GameZone	(iPhone) 7.5/10
IGN	(iPhone) 7/10
Jeuxvideo.com	(iPhone) 9/20
Macworld	3.5/5
Pocket Gamer	(iPhone) 4.5/5
TouchArcade	(iPhone) 4.5/5

The iPhone and iPad versions received "generally favorable reviews" according to the review aggregation website Metacritic.
