= Slice (2018 film) =

2018 film directed by Austin Vesely

- Theatrical release poster
- Directed by: Austin Vesely
- Written by: Austin Vesely
- Produced by: Kevin McGrail; Brandon Riley
- Starring: Zazie Beetz; Chance Bennett; Rae Gray; Marilyn Dodds Frank; Katherine Cunningham; Will Brill; Y'lan Noel; Hannibal Buress; Tim Becker; Joe Keery; Chris Parnell; Paul Scheer
- Cinematography: Brandon Riley
- Edited by: Arielle Sherman
- Music by: Ludwig Göransson; Nathan Matthew David
- Production companies: Frëhand; N2ition Cinema
- Distributed by: A24
- Release date: September 10, 2018 (United States)
- Running time: 83 minutes
- Country: United States
- Language: English

Slice is a 2018 American horror comedy film, written and directed by Austin Vesely. The film stars Zazie Beetz and Chance Bennett, with Rae Gray, Marilyn Dodds Frank, Katherine Cunningham, Will Brill, Y'lan Noel, Hannibal Buress, Tim Decker, Joe Keery, Chris Parnell, and Paul Scheer appearing in supporting roles. It follows the murders of several pizza deliverymen in the Ghost Town neighborhood of Kingfisher, and various townspeople's efforts to solve the crimes.

It was theatrically released on September 10, 2018, by A24.

== Plot ==
Kingfisher, U.S.A. is home to 40,000 ghosts—mostly victims of the former sanatorium—who live and work alongside the living, but are relocated by Mayor Tracy to an abandoned neighborhood. Perfect Pizza Base driver Sean Hammerschmidt makes a delivery to "Ghost Town", where his throat is slit by an unseen killer.

Kingfisher Chronicle reporter Sadie Sheridan attends Tracy's press conference regarding Sean's murder, which is interrupted by Debbie, a member of local activist group Justice 40,000. Their leader, Vera Marcus, holds a protest outside Perfect Pizza, which is built on the mass grave left by the sanatorium; the group seeks to demolish the Halcyon Square shopping center and lay the city's ghosts to rest. Investigating the murder, Detectives Marsh and Bradley discover that Sean was running drugs for dealer Big Cheese.

Perfect Pizza's owner Jack insists on keeping the store open, despite his staff's reluctance. Determined to solve Sean's murder, his ex-girlfriend and former coworker Astrid asks Jack for her old job back, rejoining employees Scooter, Heather, and Joe, a ghost. Astrid confronts Big Cheese, who is questioned by the detectives and explains that Perfect Pizza was formerly Yummy Yummy Chinese, whose delivery drivers were killed in a previous string of murders. The prime suspect was fellow driver Dax Lycander, a werewolf who left town.

Making another delivery in Ghost Town, Scooter's throat is slit, and Dax is spotted at the scene. Vera and Debbie are revealed to be conspiring with Tracy, bribing him to blame the murders on the ghosts and rally public support for demolishing Halcyon Square. Sadie visits Perfect Pizza with her own research into Dax and the Yummy Yummy murders, while Marsh and Bradley track down Dax. Chased into a junkyard, Dax saves Bradley from being crushed and is arrested, but maintains his innocence.

Reuniting with Sean's ghost, Astrid is disappointed to learn he is still a drug addict, before she is stabbed from behind and becomes a ghost herself. Dax escapes police custody, and Sadie realizes that Vera and her group are actually a coven of witches responsible for the murders; they have inducted Heather as their newest member. Sadie brings her discovery to the werewolf-hating Marsh, who insists that Dax is guilty. Tracy publicly declares the murders are not the work of ghosts, upsetting the coven's plans.

Heather sneaks into Perfect Pizza's basement, and Dax abducts Sadie, urging her to publicize his innocence. Sadie returns to Perfect Pizza, where she, Jack, and Joe discover the ghost of sanatorium janitor Carl in the basement, who reveals the building was built on a portal to hell, which the coven plans to use to enslave an army of ghosts. Killed by Vera, Tracy holds a press conference, but Vera reveals he has become a ghost and the coven reveal themselves as witches.

The town's frustrated ghosts turn to terrorizing the living, while a vengeful Astrid kills most of the coven. Dax is unwilling to help Astrid stop Vera, but Bradley later changes his mind. The witches prepare to access the portal, and Debbie enters Perfect Pizza only to find Jack waiting. He blows up the restaurant, believing this will stop the coven, but the explosion opens the portal instead. With Sadie watching helplessly, Astrid attacks the witches but is overpowered, and Dax intervenes in werewolf form. Marsh shoots Vera dead, while Bradley arrests Heather, and the portal closes.

Sadie is promoted to television news anchor, while Jack, now a ghost, reopens a new pizza restaurant with Dax and fellow ghosts Scooter, Joe, Carl, and Astrid.

== Cast ==
- Zazie Beetz as Astrid, an employee at Perfect Pizza Base.
- Chance Bennett as Dax Lycander, a werewolf and former deliveryman.
- Rae Gray as Sadie Sheridan, a young journalist for the Kingfisher Chronicle.
- Marilyn Dodds Frank as Vera Marcus, the leader of Justice 40,000.
- Katherine Cunningham as Heather, an employee at Perfect Pizza Base.
- Will Brill as Bradley, a police detective investigating Sean's murder and Marsh's partner.
- Y'lan Noel as Big Cheese, a drug dealer.
- Hannibal Buress as Hannibal, an employee at Magic Mountain Diner.
- Lakin Valdez as Joe, a ghost and employee at Perfect Pizza Base.
- Rudy Galvan as Thomas "Scooter" Martinez, an employee at Perfect Pizza Base.
- Tim Decker as Steve Marsh, a police detective investigating Sean's murder and Bradley's partner.
- Kelli Simpkins as Debbie Saluski, Vera's right-hand woman.
- Joe Keery as Jackson, a friend of Sadie's and the photographer for the Kingfisher Chronicle.
- Elijah Alvarado as Tweaker
- Chris Parnell as Mayor Tracy, the corrupt mayor of Kingfisher.
- Paul Scheer as Jack, the manager of Perfect Pizza Base.
- Rebecca Spence as Cheryl
- Gary Houston as Lennox, Bradley and Marsh's superior officer.
- Austin Vesely as Sean Hammerschmit, an employee at Perfect Pizza Base.
- David Ruhe as Ghost and Reporter.

== Production ==
In July 2015, it was announced Chance the Rapper had been cast in the film, with Austin Vesely directing from a screenplay he wrote. In October 2016, it was announced A24 would distribute the film. It was later revealed Zazie Beetz, Joe Keery, and Paul Scheer had joined the cast of the film. Principal photography began on August 20, 2016, in Joliet, Illinois.

=== Marketing ===
On October 31, 2017, a teaser trailer was released, confirming a 2018 release. On August 6, 2018, a teaser poster parodying the logo of pizza chain Little Caesars was revealed. This was followed by a Domino's Pizza-themed teaser poster released on August 9, as well as a Pizza Hut-themed poster released on August 15. An official trailer for the film was uploaded to YouTube on August 21, 2018.

== Release ==
The film was released on September 10, 2018. It had a video on demand release the next day. It was released on DVD in the United States on January 29, 2019.

== Reception ==
=== Critical response ===
On review aggregator Rotten Tomatoes, the film holds an approval rating of 54% with an average rating of 4.7/10 based on 24 reviews. On Metacritic, the film has a weighted average score of 61 out of 100, based on 7 critics, indicating "generally favorable reviews".

Richard Roeper of Chicago Sun-Times gave the film three stars saying "Slice is schlock, but that’s kind of the point...But it has originality, and originality goes a long way." Jamie Righetti of IndieWire gave the film a B+ and called it "a black comedy with horror elements that seems destined to become a stoner classic."
