= Call of Duty Zombies =

Game mode from the Call of Duty video game series

Call of Duty Zombies, also simply known as Zombies, is a recurring game mode in the Call of Duty series of first-person shooter video games published by Activision. Players in the mode are put up against an endless horde of zombies, and are forced to survive for as long as possible. Killing zombies grants the players points, which can be used to obtain more powerful weapons and unlock new areas of the map. The waves of zombies progressively increase in difficulty, becoming faster and having increased health. Additional features available to the player in most versions of the mode include "Perk-a-Colas", which can upgrade players abilities, and a "Pack-a-Punch" machine that allows players to upgrade their weapons. Many maps feature easter eggs and quests, which players can interact with and complete. These range from quests that trigger secret songs to those that progress the overarching storyline of the Zombies mode.

The mode was originally introduced with Call of Duty: World at War (2008), which was developed by Treyarch. The concept for the Zombies mode was created by Treyarch designer Jesse Snyder, who based the concept off of a scrapped mode for the game where players would defend against Allied soldiers during the Normandy landings. Although the mode was almost cancelled by studio head Mark Lamia, due to its creation while the game was behind schedule and the risk behind the mode, it was later included in the final game under the clause that the mode only be a bonus feature unlocked after completing the game's campaign. The mode was later unlocked to all players and received several new maps in the form of downloadable content (DLC). Several future games in the Call of Duty series—mainly titles part of the Black Ops sub-series—would go on to feature their own iteration of the Zombies mode, introducing new mechanics to the mode as well as progressing the overarching story of the series. The mode has been featured in thirteen Call of Duty games, with its most recent appearance being in Call of Duty: Black Ops 7 (2025).

Zombies is one of the most popular modes in the Call of Duty series, with the Zombies mode being a main reason for many players to purchase the game. Dedicated communities exist for the mode related to its easter eggs, while games such as Call of Duty: Black Ops III (2015) remained popular five years after release due to the mode, despite later iterations. Two standalone versions of the Zombies mode have been released for mobile devices: Call of Duty: World at War – Zombies (2009) and Call of Duty: Black Ops – Zombies (2011). A standalone Zombies game was being developed by Raven Software from 2011 to 2012 before being cancelled. A comic book series based on the mode, written by Justin Jordan and published by Dark Horse Comics, was released starting in February 2016. Two soundtrack albums containing music from the mode's history have been released, specifically in 2011 and 2013.

== Overview ==
=== Gameplay ===
A gameplay screenshot of the Zombies mode as it is in Call of Duty: Black Ops III (2015). The player is shooting at a zombie with their Ray Gun Mark II.

Zombies is a co-operative game mode in the Call of Duty series of first-person shooter video games, usually titles part of the Black Ops sub-series. The mode puts players up against an endless horde of zombies, and requires them to survive for as long as possible. Killing zombies grants players points, which can be used to unlock additional areas in the map and acquire more powerful weapons. Each wave of zombies progressively increases in difficulty, with zombies becoming faster and being able to take more damage before dying. Maps also typically feature a "mystery box", which allows the player to obtain a randomly-selected weapon, as well as "wall-buys", which are chalk outlines of weapons found on walls around the map, allowing the player to choose a specific weapon to buy.The box also allows players to acquire more unique weapons specifically to the Zombies mode, such as a "wonder weapons". Wonder weapons are unique, fictional weapons that are generally powerful, with the ray gun being the first wonder weapon introduced in World at War. Several wonder weapons are exclusive to their own single map, with some being attained through completion of quests or building instead of through the mystery box. Specific maps sometimes include additional gadgets or traps that can be used to fend off zombies.

Players are able to drink "Perk-a-Colas" (generally referred to as simply "perks"), which are scattered around the map and upgrade their stats or offer unique abilities. Examples of perks include "Juggernog", which increases the players health, or "Stamin-Up", which increases their walk and sprint speed. Players can also upgrade their weapons with the maps "Pack-a-Punch" machine. Many Zombies maps include easter eggs, which allow the players to interact with specific map objects. These range from quests that trigger secret songs to those that progress the overarching storyline of the Zombies mode. Later iterations of the mode would add major easter eggs, known as a "main quest", to each map.

=== Setting ===
Settings for Zombies maps span across the world during several points in history, such as World War I, World War II, and the Prohibition era. Settings for maps across iterations of the Zombies modes include a fantastical interpretation of Stalingrad with fire-breathing dragons ("Gorod Krovi"), the Pentagon ("Five"), and the Moon. The earliest Zombies maps were oriented around Nazi zombies. In addition, the Zombies modes feature a storyline that spans across the modes iterations across several games, including Call of Duty: World at War (2008), Call of Duty: Black Ops (2010), Call of Duty: Black Ops II (2012), and Call of Duty: Black Ops III (2015). Call of Duty: Black Ops 4 (2018) continued the story in the form of the "Aether" storyline while also introducing the "Chaos" story, which runs independently from the Aether storyline. Black Ops 4 also served as the conclusion of the Aether storyline.

With Call of Duty: Black Ops Cold War (2020), Treyarch soft-rebooted the Zombies story with an alternate dimension known as the Dark Aether. The dimension was created during the ending of the Zombies mode in Black Ops 4, when several alternate timelines and dimensions from the Zombies universe were sealed into one. The Dark Aether storyline was later continued with Call of Duty: Vanguard (2021), Call of Duty: Modern Warfare III (2023), and Call of Duty: Black Ops 6 (2024). Other games with Zombies feature their own, independent themes from other games, such as Call of Duty: Infinite Warfare (2016), which has a futuristic theme and maps inspired by horror movies from the 1980s.

== History ==
=== Creation and World at War ===
The concept for the Zombies mode was created by Treyarch designer Jesse Snyder during the development of Call of Duty: World at War. The idea came after several developers of the game wanted to include a bonus stage in the game, similar to what the preceding game in the series, Call of Duty 4: Modern Warfare (2007) had. Their original idea was to create a minigame where players took on the role of German soldiers fighting off waves of Allied attackers at the Normandy landings, though this was scrapped. Later in the game's development, another developer at Treyarch stated that the in-game animations for Japanese soldiers after getting hit by rockets "looked like zombies". Hearing this, Snyder took inspiration from a zombie defense Flash game, The Last Stand, and combined it with the concept of "being over run [sic] and not really being able to win", deviating from the series tradition of "[feeling] invincible, that when things go wrong you'll be okay, and that everyone lives to see the next day". A small team began working on the Zombies mode, with developers from other parts of Treyarch beginning to chip in.

When Treyarch studio head Mark Lamia heard about the modes existence, he initially tried to shut it down, due to the state of development at the time and how they were behind schedule. However, when he played the mode for himself, he decided that the mode had to be finished and put into the final game. He believed Activision would likely not accept the mode, fearing that it would be "doing something so off with such a successful brand", and would likely be too ridiculous to market. He decided to let the popularity of the mode spread throughout the development team rather than pitch the mode formally. An agreement was reached where the mode would not be marketed as part of the game, and would only be unlockable after players completed the game's campaign as a bonus mode. The mode was later unlocked for everyone after the mode proved to be popular amongst players. Originally, the mode only had one map: "Nacht der Untoten", and was known as "Nazi Zombies". Downloadable content (DLC) was later released for the game that added new Zombies maps. The first map to be added via DLC was "Verrückt", which expanded upon the gameplay mechanics of "Nacht der Untoten" by adding Perk-a-Colas, traps, and a power switch. It was later followed by "Shi no Numa" and "Der Riese". During this period, a recurring cast of playable protagonists was introduced: Edward Richtofen, Tank Dempsey, Takeo Masaki, and Nikolai Belinski, who would go on to feature across multiple later titles in the series. A fourth DLC was being worked on for World at War, with three Zombies maps being planned for it, although development of it was halted so that developers could focus on Call of Duty: Black Ops. All three maps were repurposed for Black Ops and its DLC. A standalone mobile version of the Zombies mode in World at War, Call of Duty: World at War – Zombies, was released in 2009.

=== Later iterations ===
Black Ops launched with two Zombies maps: "Kino der Toten", set within an abandoned Nazi theatre, and "Five", set within The Pentagon. In "Five" players can play as real-life politicians John F. Kennedy, Fidel Castro, Richard Nixon, and Robert McNamara. Also included in the game was a new Zombies-based mode called Dead Ops Arcade. Like World at War, the game received DLC that introduced new Zombies maps to the game, starting with "Ascension". It was followed by "Call of the Dead", "Shangri-La", and "Moon", the last of which was released alongside remastered versions of all four Zombies maps from World at War. The playable crew in "Call of the Dead" were all voiced by celebrity actors, which would be occasionally repeated in later iterations. Like with World at War, a standalone version of the Zombies mode from Black Ops for mobile devices was released in 2011.

Call of Duty: Black Ops II launched with a re-imagining of the Zombies mode, with a focus on making each Zombies map feel more like a campaign rather than a mini-game. This started with "TranZit", an open world mode that encouraged player exploration of a large, post-apocalyptic map. Call of Duty: Black Ops II also introduced a new group of playable survivors in "TranZit": Samuel J. Stuhlinger, Abigail "Misty" Briarton, Marlton Johnson, and Russman. Players are able to traverse "TranZit" with assistance from a bus that travels across the map. Those who pre-ordered the game also gained access to a Zombies rendition of the multiplayer map "Nuketown", with the map becoming available for everyone later on. DLC for the game would go on to add "Die Rise", "Mob of the Dead", and "Buried". Each new map continued to expand upon the mechanics of the Zombies mode.

Originally, Zombies maps were mostly separate from each other in terms of narrative and setting. When development of one map was done, the developers would immediately move on to the next. Prior to the creation of the final Black Ops II DLC map, "Origins", the developers of the mode started working on an overarching story for the Zombies mode, connecting all of the maps and planning out the future ones to line up with the story. The story and setting for every Zombies map in Black Ops III was planned out before "Origins" was released for Black Ops II. Black Ops III released in 2015 with the "Shadows of Evil" map. A remake of "Der Riese", known as "The Giant", was made available as a bonus map for the Collector's Edition. Four other new maps were later released for the game: "Der Eisendrache", "Zetsubou no Shima", "Gorod Krovi", and "Revelations". In 2017, Treyarch released the "Zombie Chronicles" DLC for Black Ops III, featuring remakes of eight maps from previous Call of Duty games. Starting with Call of Duty: Advanced Warfare in 2014, other Call of Duty games outside of the Black Ops sub-series began to feature their own iterations of the Zombies mode. The iteration of the mode in Advanced Warfare is known as "Exo-Zombies". Zombies was later featured in Call of Duty: Infinite Warfare and Call of Duty: WWII (2017).

Black Ops 4 launched in 2018 with three maps: "IX", "Voyage of Despair", and "Blood of the Dead". Black Ops 4 introduced a loadout system for Zombies, allowing users to spawn in with a customized loadout, rather than starting a map with nothing and having to find weapons and upgrades. Later updates to the game added five more maps: "Classified", "Ancient Evil", "Dead of the Night", "Alpha Omega", and "Tag der Toten". Black Ops Cold War launched with one map, "Die Maschine", and reworked several core Zombies mechanics. For example, weapon upgrading and perks became tier-based, and a battle pass was added that could be advanced through playing Zombies. Other maps added to the game later on included "Firebase Z", "Mauer der Toten", and "Forsaken". Black Ops Cold War also introduced a new mode called Outbreak, which is an open world mode that integrates several mechanics and features from other Call of Duty modes, as well as Call of Duty: Warzone. A similar mode to Outbreak was later featured in Call of Duty: Modern Warfare III (2023) named "Operation Deadbolt" (or simply Modern Warfare Zombies, shortened to MWZ).

A Zombies mode was included in Call of Duty: Vanguard (2021). In comparison to previous iterations of the mode, this iteration removed the round-based gameplay of previous iterations in favor of objective-based progression, and lacked easter eggs and story quests at launch. The first two maps released for the mode, "Der Anfang" and "Terra Maledicta", followed the objective-based gameplay. A round-based map was later released in the form of a remade version of World at War's "Shi no Numa", and later "The Archon", which was the final map released for Vanguard. Black Ops 6 launched with two Zombies maps: "Terminus" and "Liberty Falls". These maps were followed by "Citadelle des Morts", "The Tomb", "Shattered Veil", and "The Reckoning".

Zombies returned in Call of Duty: Black Ops 7 (2025), which featured one map at launch being "Ashes of the Damned". Black Ops 7 reintroduced "Survival" maps, which are smaller playable areas adapted from the game's primary maps. At launch, the mode featured one map, "Vandorm Farm". Additional maps released post-launch included "Astra Malorum", "Paradox Junction", "Totenreich", " Kowakujō", and "Rex Infernus". Other Survival maps added through post-release content included "Exit 115", "Zarya Cosmodrome", "Mars", "Ashwood", " Nuked",and "Eidskallen Lighthouse".

== Music ==
Zombies maps typically feature a secret song, which require players to search for easter eggs or complete a quest. Upon completion, that maps secret song will play. These songs are usually composed by Kevin Sherwood, with vocals from another artist. The most common singer was Elena Siegman, who sang the secret songs for zombie modes up until Black Ops 4, when guest singers started being used for most secret songs. Songs not made by Sherwood have also been used for Zombies, such as "Not Ready to Die" and "Nightmare" by Avenged Sevenfold, which are featured on "Call of the Dead" and "Moon", respectively.

On January 5, 2011, Activision released the soundtrack for the modes iteration in Black Ops, featuring 17 tracks composed for the mode. It was released digitally through Fontana Distribution. One song from the album, "115", was certified gold by the Recording Industry Association of America in 2025. The soundtrack for "Mob of the Dead" was released in April 2013. It features 24 tracks, most of which were made specifically for "Mob of the Dead", alongside previously unreleased tracks made for "Tranzit" and "Die Rise".

== Associated media ==
=== Comic books ===
Starting in 2016, a series of comic books based on Zombies was released. The storyline of the comics, while not a direct adaptation of the Zombies storyline, is loosely based on the events of Black Ops II Zombies. The comics were published by Dark Horse Comics, and written by Justin Jordan.

=== Cancelled standalone game by Raven Software ===
From 2011 to 2012, a standalone game based on the Zombies mode was being developed by Raven Software. It was going to be a live service game, with Michael Gummelt serving as the project's lead designer. Gummelt described his vision of the game as starting off players in a gladiator arena inspired by the Mad Max franchise, where players were being used as entertainment during a zombie apocalypse. Eventually, players would be able to escape from the arena, where they could then explore an open world while fighting zombies and collecting rewards. The game was being developed during a transitional period between leadership of Treyarch, where the studio gave control of Zombies to Raven, before Treyarch requested control over Zombies back.

== Reception ==
Critical reception of the Zombies mode has varied significantly across installments, ranging from widespread acclaim to more divided responses, with retrospective opinion on older titles also sometimes differing from their original release.

In a retrospective review of the mode's original iteration in World at War, David Meikleham of GamesRadar+ labeled the Zombies mode as the "greatest minigames [sic] ever conceived". Reviewing the same iteration, Seth Parmer of TheGamer wrote: "[T]he Zombies mode ... birthed an entire storyline and fanbase due to how downright fun and replayable it was." Retrospective reviewers often praise the simplicity of the iteration and credited its importance for introducing the Zombies mode. Black Ops was also well received, with reviewers overall praising the return of the mode. Retrospective reviewers share similar praise, claiming the mode was a strong expansion from the previous iteration.

Upon launch, Black Ops II Zombies mostly received praise by reviewers with highlights focusing on the open-world nature of the map "TranZit" and the new features that the iteration introduced. Lorenzo Veloria of GamesRadar+ stated that "TranZit expands Zombies from a traditional horde mode to a full apocalyptic adventure." However, some reviewers commented on how the mode was too challenging and criticized the repetitive gameplay, with Chris Watters of Gamespot describing the mode as "stagnant". Retrospective opinion on Black Ops II has been heavily divided, with some maps such as "Mob of the Dead" being strongly praised, and others, such as "TranZit" being heavily criticized.

Black Ops III Zombies, like the previous installment, was well received by critics on release. Upon the iteration's debut, the map "Shadows of Evil" received praise for its story-rich characters, new features, and the realistic 1940s setting, with Mike Mahardy of Gamespot saying "...this new take on Zombies is bizarre. It’s also fantastic." The later release of the "Zombies Chronicles" DLC was also well received as a positive, content-rich addition to the game, with reviewers' main criticism being its price. In a 2025 retrospective review of Black Ops III, Dominic Allen of ScreenRant described the iteration as "arguably the best Zombies mode ever created for Call of Duty and remains a general fan-favorite of the series."

Black Ops 4 Zombies generally received positive reviews with critics praising its depth of gameplay. Nick Plessas of Electronic Gaming Monthly specifically noted the large changes to the mode compared to previous entries and described the edition as "a new version of Zombies".

The non-Treyarch iterations of Zombies included in Advanced Warfare, Infinite Warfare, and WWII, have received mixed critical reception when compared to that of the Treyarch produced games. Both Infinite Warfare and WWII were praised by critics upon release, while Advanced Warfare was criticized by reviewers at GamesRadar+ and at Gamespot. Miranda Sanchez of IGN stated that WWII Zombies "...strikes a rewarding balance for the diehard zombies fans and those that just want to have a good time."

Recent iterations of Zombies have received more mixed reviews. David Jagneux of IGN had a mixed view on the Zombies mode on Black Ops Cold War at launch, saying that "[This] Zombies mode has some of the best moment-to-moment gameplay in the series but its single map and lack of split-screen multiplayer sap its endurance". Vanguard Zombies was less well received than previous entries, with many reviewers criticising the lack of content on launch, as well as the initial removal of the "round-based" format. Phil Hornshaw of Gamespot criticized the lack of an "easter-egg" to solve, saying that until further content is added, "Zombies feels a bit lacking compared to past games". Modern Warfare III (2023) was the first and only title in the Modern Warfare series to receive a Zombies mode, with critics finding the mode similar to the "DMZ" mode found in iterations of Warzone.

Black Ops 6 received stronger reviews than that of Vanguard and Modern Warfare III, with Will Borger of IGN describing the mode as "absurd and campy fun" whilst specifically praising the two launch maps. A review by Phil Hornshaw of Gamespot also reviewed the game positively, with highlights focusing on the challenging gameplay and new additions, including "omni-movement". Both reviewers also praised the return of the "round-based" format which had been initially removed in Vanguard Zombies. Critical reception to Black Ops 7 Zombies was mixed. Borger reviewed this iteration with less praise, saying it "isn't bad, but it feels like a remnant of something greater, a shambling corpse that reminds us of the person it used to be", while S.E Doster at Gamespot was less critical and praised the mode, saying "Black Ops 7 provides enjoyable ways to slay the undead."

== Community ==
Zombies is one of Call of Duty's most popular game modes, with large amounts of players purchasing games in the series solely to play the mode. Several communities have been created by players dedicated towards discovering and solving easter eggs within the mode, particularly on Black Ops 4. Black Ops III has also garnered a dedicated community regarding its iteration of Zombies, with Steam Workshop allowing users to create custom maps and player models. The popularity of the game's iteration was noted by Aron Garst of GameSpot as lasting well into 2020, five years after release, despite the release of later games in the series that also featured Zombies. Zombies has also held a strong presence on YouTube, with several youtubers becoming influential within the community, such as NoahJ456 and MrRoflWaffles.

== Games ==
As a mode

- Call of Duty: World at War (2008)
- Call of Duty: Black Ops (2010)
- Call of Duty: Black Ops II (2012)
- Call of Duty: Advanced Warfare (Sledgehammer Games, 2014)
- Call of Duty: Black Ops III (2015)
- Call of Duty: Infinite Warfare (Infinity Ward, 2016)
- Call of Duty: WWII (Sledgehammer Games, 2017)
- Call of Duty: Black Ops 4 (2018)
- Call of Duty: Black Ops Cold War (2020)
- Call of Duty: Vanguard (2021)
- Call of Duty: Modern Warfare III (Sledgehammer Games, 2023)
- Call of Duty: Black Ops 6 (2024)
- Call of Duty: Black Ops 7 (2025)

As a standalone release

- Call of Duty: World at War – Zombies (2009)
- Call of Duty: Black Ops – Zombies (2011)

== See also ==
- Survival mode
- List of zombie video games
