= Call of Duty: Black Ops 6 =

2024 video game

- Developers: Treyarch; Raven Software (Note: Windows version developed by Beenox. Additional development work by Activision Central Design, Activision Central Technology, Activision Shanghai, Beenox, Demonware, High Moon Studios, Infinity Ward, and Sledgehammer Games.)
- Publisher: Activision
- Producer: Natalie Pohorski
- Designers: Justin Negrete; Matt Scronce
- Artist: Wil Wells
- Writers: Murray Kraft; Craig Houston; Dan Laufer
- Composer: Jack Wall
- Series: Call of Duty
- Platforms: PlayStation 4; PlayStation 5; Windows; Xbox One; Xbox Series X/S
- Release: October 25, 2024
- Genre: First-person shooter
- Modes: Single-player, multiplayer

Call of Duty: Black Ops 6 is a 2024 first-person shooter video game co-developed by Treyarch and Raven Software and published by Activision. It is the twenty-first main installment of the Call of Duty series and is the seventh entry in the Black Ops sub-series, following Call of Duty: Black Ops Cold War (2020). Set during Operation Desert Storm, Black Ops 6's single-player story follows rogue CIA operatives Troy Marshall and Frank Woods as they assemble a team of agents to hunt down Pantheon, a paramilitary group with covert ties to the agency. As with previous Call of Duty titles, the game also includes a multiplayer component and a new iteration of the cooperative round-based Zombies mode.

Black Ops 6 had a four-year development cycle—the longest in Call of Duty history; a portion of the game's production was spent on rebuilding core aspects of Black Ops within the latest version of the Call of Duty game engine. An omnidirectional movement system was also introduced, allowing players to sprint, dive, and slide in any direction. Marketing for Black Ops 6 began in May 2024, through the release of live-action teaser trailers and the publishing of advertisements on the front pages of multiple newspaper outlets; a full reveal debuted during the 2024 Xbox Games Showcase event on June 9. The game was released on October 25, 2024, for PlayStation 4, PlayStation 5, Windows, Xbox One, and Xbox Series X/S.

Upon release, Black Ops 6 received generally favorable reviews from critics, achieved the largest launch weekend in the franchise's history, and was nominated for several accolades. All three modes were met with praise, with critics positively highlighting the new omnidirectional movement system. A sequel, titled Call of Duty: Black Ops 7, was released in November 2025.

== Gameplay ==
New to Call of Duty: Black Ops 6 is omnidirectional movement, allowing players to sprint, dive, and slide in any direction. The above clip demonstrates the omnidirectional sprinting ability.

Call of Duty: Black Ops 6 is a first-person shooter. Depending on the game mode selected, players use a selection of military equipment, such as weapons, "field upgrades", and "scorestreaks", to combat AI opponents, other human players, or undead creatures. Players can perform a wide variety of movement actions when traversing a level/map, including walking, crouching, sprinting, jumping, sliding, and diving; while sprinting, players can initiate a "tactical sprint", which further increases the player's movement speed for a limited duration. In a change from previous Call of Duty titles, players have omnidirectional control over the sprint, dive, and slide mechanics, allowing them to perform these actions in any direction; players can also rotate themselves in a 360-degree view while they are laying in the prone position. In addition, a series of "Intelligent Movement" settings are also available to players, which automate certain movement actions, including sprinting and mantling.

Black Ops 6 features three main game modes: a single-player campaign, a multiplayer component and a new iteration of the cooperative round-based Zombies mode. In the campaign, players assume control of a silent protagonist, "Case", as he and a team of rogue CIA operatives work to hunt down Pantheon, a paramilitary group with covert ties to the agency. The campaign features 11 missions, and is estimated to take at least 8 hours to complete. Players typically have multiple ways to approach a mission's objectives; some missions include stealth elements. In-between missions, players are able to access a safe house, where they can select new missions via an evidence board, interact with non-player characters (NPCs), and spend cash, which is found throughout missions, on various in-game perks; these are split across three categories, which are related to the player's physical abilities, weapons, and gear. Certain campaign missions reward players with cosmetic items for use in the multiplayer and Zombies modes upon their completion, including weapon "blueprints", player skins, stickers, and weapon charms.

The multiplayer component puts two opposing teams—"Rogue Black Ops" and "Crimson One"—against each other across a wide selection of game modes, such as Team Deathmatch, Domination, Hardpoint, and Kill Order, most of which allow for six-versus-six combat; an exception to this is the round-based "Gunfight" mode, which puts two teams of two on small-sized maps with randomized loadouts. Like previous Call of Duty games, player performance is tracked with experience points (XP), which can be earned by killing enemy players, completing objectives, or finishing challenges; XP can also be earned in the Zombies mode. As players rank up, they gain access to various loadout items, including new weapons, pieces of equipment, and perks, the latter of which are split into three "combat specialties"; selecting three perks of the same specialty grants access to in-game buffs. Once players reach level 55, they can choose to enter the "Prestige" ranking system, which resets their progress back to level 1 but grants a set of cosmetic rewards and a token that can be used to permanently unlock any loadout item. This process can be done up to ten times; once players complete the tenth Prestige, they are granted the ability to rank up to level 1000, and if they do so, they receive additional cosmetic items.

In Zombies, one to four players fight endless hordes of the undead, which increase in both number and difficulty with every completed round, across six maps, which directly continue the mode's storyline after the events of Call of Duty: Black Ops Cold War (2020). Each map includes a main quest that players must solve without any guidance, along with a number of side quests and Easter eggs. Two additional modes—"Directed" and "Grief"—were added to all maps post-launch; the former allows players to complete main quests with in-game assistance, while the latter pits two teams of four players against one another as they attempt to survive the undead, while hindering the enemy team indirectly via debuffs. Zombies features two primary currencies for players to manage: "Essence" and "Salvage"; Essence is used to unlock access to new parts of the maps, acquire weapon upgrades from the "Pack-a-Punch" machine, and to purchase additional player upgrades, including "Perk-a-Cola" cans and armor vests, while Salvage is used to acquire ammo modifications for the player's weapons, increase a weapon's damage tier, and to craft various pieces of lethal and tactical equipment. Players can also obtain "GobbleGums"—single-use consumables that grant various in-game effects—and unlock "Augments", a set of minor and major upgrades to perks, field upgrades and ammo mods. Each perk, field upgrade, and ammo mod features up to three minor and major Augments, with one of each type being equippable at the same time, allowing players to customize and experiment with different play styles.

== Plot ==
Amidst the start of Operation Desert Storm, CIA operatives Troy Marshall (Y'lan Noel) and William "Case" Calderon, along with their handler, Operations Specialist Jane Harrow (Dawn Olivieri), are deployed to the Iraq–Kuwait border to extract Iraqi minister of defence Saeed Alawi (Jordan Bielsky), but are forced to go off mission when Alawi claims to be targeted by a paramilitary force called "Pantheon". After surviving an encounter with Pantheon soldiers, the team prepares to extract Alawi, but he is executed by Russell Adler (Bruce Thomas), a rogue agent who fled from the CIA after being framed as a mole for the Nicaraguan drug lord Raul Menendez. Adler allows himself to be captured, telling Marshall to relay a message to fellow operative Frank Woods (Damon Victor Allen): "Bishop takes Rook". Afterwards, CIA Deputy Director Daniel Livingstone (Lou Diamond Phillips) reprimands the team for Alawi's death, ignores their warnings about Pantheon, and suspends Woods, Marshall, and Case from duty.

Woods tells Marshall that Adler's message refers to an abandoned KGB safe house in Bulgaria—code-named "the Rook"—that the two discovered in 1976, and decides to go there with Marshall and Case to investigate Pantheon; Harrow stays behind to cover for their absence. After using his files to recruit ex-Stasi technical genius Felix Neumann (Seamus Dever) and assassin Sevati "Sev" Dumas (Karen David), the team breaks Adler out of a CIA black site hidden under Washington, D.C., while a political event hosted by Governor Bill Clinton (Jim Meskimen) takes place above ground. The team extracts Adler just as Pantheon assaults the black site, but they are blamed for the attack instead and are declared fugitives. Adler reveals that Pantheon has been engaging in weapons deals with Saddam Hussein; with help from MI6 agent Helen Park (Lily Cowles) and allied SAS forces, the team assaults one of Hussein's palaces in Iraq, where they find "the Cradle", a psychochemical weapon originating from an abandoned CIA biolab in Kentucky.

While Adler stays behind to track down Pantheon's head scientist, Matvey Gusev (Yuri Lowenthal), Case, Marshall, and Sev investigate the biolab. Case is separated from Marshall and Sev; he accidentally inhales the Cradle and hallucinates fighting off undead creatures while hearing a woman's voice, which explains that Pantheon was originally a secret CIA division overseeing the Cradle's development as a performance-enhancing drug, with Case being the only test subject, before Livingstone shut down the project and disbanded Pantheon. As Case regains his senses, the team discovers that Pantheon has stolen the biolab's stores of the Cradle, and also finds a recording revealing that Harrow is working with Pantheon. Using clues in the recording, the team steals financial records from a casino in the Mediterranean principality of Avalon, which reveal that it had been wiring money to Gusev in Iraq. Afterwards, Case and Marshall reunite with Adler in Kuwait and work with his old ally, U.S. Army Captain Lawrence Sims (Reggie Watkins), to capture Gusev, who reveals that the Cradle is being stored in Vorkuta.

The team raids Vorkuta, and while they are unable to stop the Cradle from being moved, they capture Harrow and bring her to the Rook for interrogation. Adler injects Harrow with a truth serum, prompting her to reveal that she joined Pantheon after they leaked information claiming the CIA was responsible for her parents' deaths in 1960, and that Pantheon is planning to use the Cradle to carry out a false flag attack on the Capitol Building to discredit Livingstone and replace him with Harrow, putting them in control of the agency. Pantheon forces assault the Rook and rescue Harrow; Case gives chase and boards Harrow's escape helicopter, causing it to crash in a nearby river. Under the influence of released Cradle gas, Case strangles Harrow to death before presumably drowning. Marshall tries to radio Case, explaining that Livingstone managed to evacuate the Capitol. Two weeks later, the team meets with Livingstone, who asks them to continue working as an independent clandestine unit to fully eradicate Pantheon, who is conducting operations in Avalon. Meanwhile, Pantheon operative Jackson Caine (Rick Pasqualone) infiltrates Livingstone's office and accesses his computer.

== Development ==
Treyarch and Raven Software co-developed Black Ops 6, with Raven leading production on the game's single-player campaign and Treyarch developing the multiplayer and Zombies modes. Activision Central Design, Activision Central Technology, Activision Shanghai, Beenox, Demonware, High Moon Studios, Infinity Ward, and Sledgehammer Games provided additional development work on the title, with Beenox also leading work on the Windows version. It is the seventh entry in Call of Duty's Black Ops sub-series, following Call of Duty: Black Ops Cold War (2020).

The game had a four-year development cycle, the longest in Call of Duty history, and entered play-testing in 2022. According to associate design director Matt Scronce, the extended production allowed the developers to be "very intentional about what it means to be a Black Ops game" and to re-examine key features, including visual fidelity, movement, and campaign design; they also re-added several fan-favorite features from previous Call of Duty titles that had been absent from recent entries, including the "Prestige" ranking system and the "Theater" mode, which allows players to rewatch their previous multiplayer matches.

Black Ops 6 is built on Call of Duty's "shared" game engine, first introduced in Call of Duty: Modern Warfare II (2022); previous Treyarch titles used a separate engine developed at the studio. A portion of the game's four-year development was spent on rebuilding "the core Black Ops experience" from the ground-up within the new engine and ensuring that the multiplayer mode "[felt] like Black Ops." Treyarch also overhauled the user interface for the Call of Duty HQ launcher—a hub for accessing the latest Call of Duty titles and Call of Duty: Warzone—to address design issues found in Modern Warfare II and Call of Duty: Modern Warfare III (2023) and to provide players with direct access to titles within Call of Duty HQ.

=== Music ===
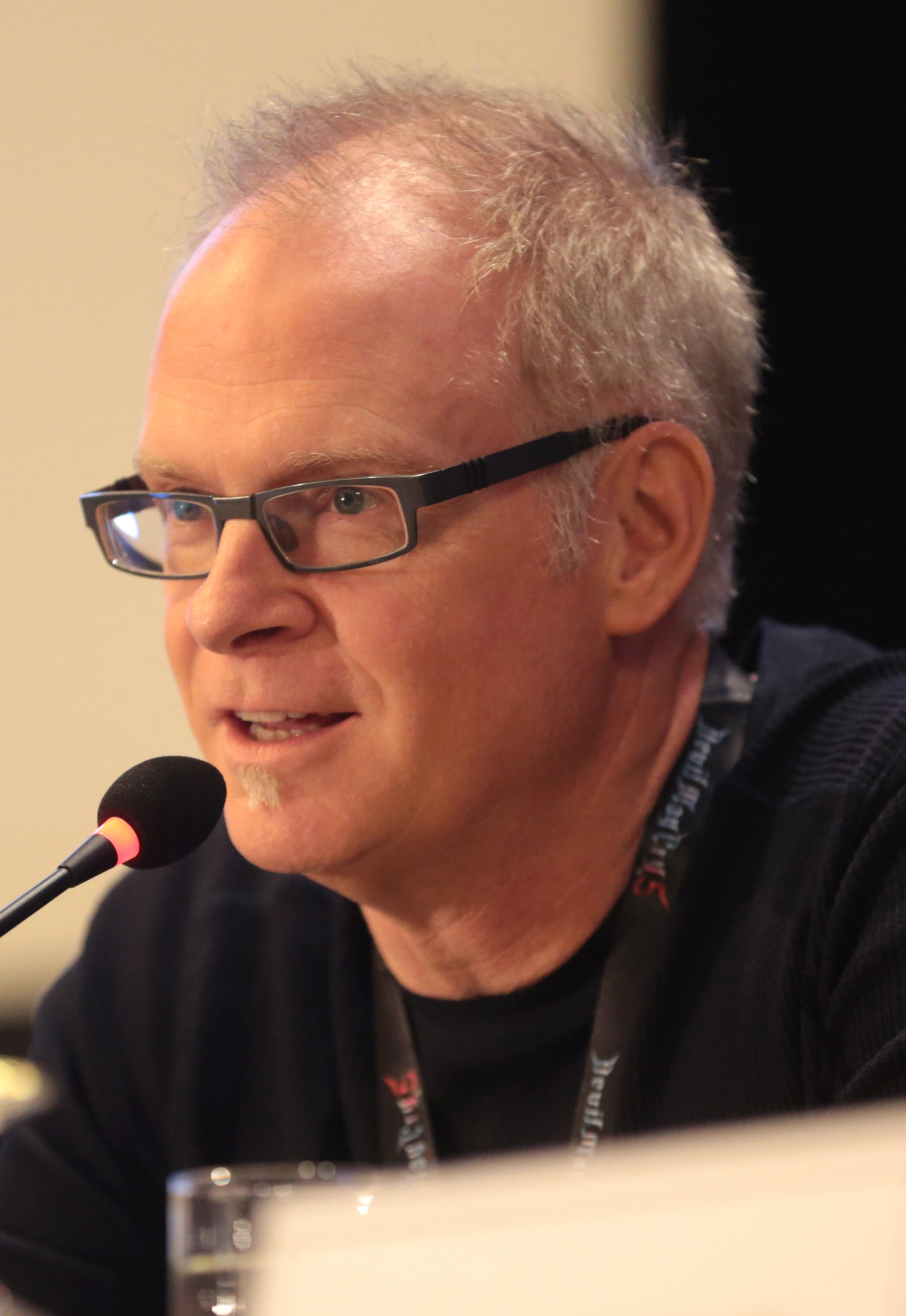
Jack Wall (pictured) composed the score for Black Ops 6.

Jack Wall composed the music for Black Ops 6, as he had done for every entry in the sub-series since Call of Duty: Black Ops II (2012). Jim Lordeman, Jimmy Hinson, and Canadian rock duo Romes provided additional music; Wall collaborated with Hinson and Romes on the main theme song for the game's multiplayer, titled "Raining the Fire". Additionally, Kevin Sherwood composed original songs for every Black Ops 6 Zombies map, which are hidden as Easter eggs within the maps. Each map's song features a unique vocalist; singers include Cristina Scabbia, Megan Rice, Vicky Psarakis, Matt Heafy, Malukah, and Elena Siegman. Bassist Juan Garcia-Herreros also contributed to Wall's score.

Wall started working on Black Ops 6's score near the end of March 2024; he initially worked on one of the game's levels, "The Cradle", to allow the development team to implement his music as a proof-of-concept, before moving to write the game's main theme, feeling that if he went "too far without a theme, it's going to feel like nothing's really connected"; once he completed the theme, the score began to "[fall] into place". Wall sought to incorporate the grunge sound of the early 1990s—the era in which the game is set in—and combine it with his orchestral and synth work. He reached out to Romes after listening to some of their work on Instagram; the duo went on to "fuck up" some score tracks for the game with "snarling guitar[s] and thundering drums".

== Marketing ==
Activision and Microsoft released the first reveal trailer for Black Ops 6 during the 2024 Xbox Games Showcase event on June 9. Immediately following the event, a 25-minute long "Direct" presentation aired, which revealed details on the game's storyline, gameplay mechanics, and the Zombies mode; further details about the multiplayer and Zombies modes were shared at the 2024 Call of Duty: Next showcase event on August 28. The prior month, Activision promoted the title via the release of two live-action teaser trailers, a series of video clips on a website titled "TheTruthLies.com", which featured footage of Mount Rushmore being vandalized by a group of people, and via the publishing of fictional news reports on several newspaper outlets, including USA Today and The New York Post. Teasers also began to appear in Call of Duty: Warzone, including a cinematic featuring Black Ops character Frank Woods.

On August 1, Treyarch revealed a new version of "TheTruthLies.com"—named "The Truth Dies"—which featured teasers for the Zombies mode. On August 6, a cinematic trailer for the Zombies map "Terminus" was released, along with details on Black Ops 6's Zombies storyline and characters; a gameplay trailer was published on August 8, along with a blog post outlining the mode's core gameplay systems. On August 20, Raven Software presented gameplay footage from the campaign at Gamescom 2024.

Through the end of September, October and November, Activision released several live-action commercials featuring "The Replacer" (portrayed by Peter Stormare), a character who has been tasked with taking on the responsibilities of various individuals within their lives while they are spending their time playing Black Ops 6. Stormare previously portrayed the role in the marketing campaigns for Black Ops II, Call of Duty: Black Ops III (2015), and Call of Duty: Black Ops 4 (2018), but was absent from Black Ops Cold War's marketing; due to fan comments regarding the Replacer's absence from Black Ops Cold War, Activision chief marketing officer Tyler Bahl and his team opted to more widely feature the character for Black Ops 6's marketing. Throughout the commercials, the Replacer acts as a stand-in for a firefighter, a ride-share driver, the Pope, Arizona Cardinals quarterback Kyler Murray, and a contestant on Jeopardy. He is also featured as a playable character in Black Ops 6 and Warzone.

== Release ==
Black Ops 6 was released on October 25, 2024, for PlayStation 4, PlayStation 5, Windows, Xbox One, and Xbox Series X/S. The title was made available to subscribers of select Xbox Game Pass plans on release day, including Xbox Game Pass Ultimate, PC Game Pass and Xbox Game Pass for Console. It is also available on select cloud gaming platforms, including GeForce Now and Xbox Cloud Gaming. The game requires a continuous internet connection to play all of its modes, including the single-player campaign; Activision has stated that the requirement is due to a texture streaming feature, which is used to ensure the best possible visual quality without significantly increasing the game's file size. Black Ops 6 was blocked from sale in Kuwait prior to its release, with all pre-orders in the country being cancelled and refunded. No reason was given by Kuwaiti officials for the ban; publications speculated it was due to the game's Gulf War setting.

Those who pre-ordered Black Ops 6 or had an active subscription to Xbox Game Pass received early access to an open beta test for the game's multiplayer component. The early access period took place from August 30 to September 4, while a second period, available to all players, began on September 6 and concluded on September 9. Black Ops 6's multiplayer beta received mostly positive critic impressions, with some highlighting the omnidirectional movement system as a standout feature.

=== Post-release updates ===
Following the game's release, Treyarch supported Black Ops 6 with free seasonal updates, which added new content to the multiplayer and Zombies modes, including new maps, weapons, playable characters, and game modes. Each "season" also featured a premium battle pass and a series of cosmetic items, available for purchase by players through an in-game store. Six total seasons were released for the game; the first season was released on November 14, 2024, the second on January 28, 2025, the third on April 2, the fourth on May 29, the fifth on August 7, and the sixth and final season on October 9. The seasonal updates also included crossover content with several media franchises and celebrities in the form of playable characters for the multiplayer and Zombies modes; notable tie-ins include characters from Netflix's Squid Game TV series, such as the Front Man, the Pink Guards, the VIPs, and Young-hee, characters from the Teenage Mutant Ninja Turtles franchise, such as Leonardo, Donatello, Raphael, Michelangelo, and Splinter, actor Seth Rogen, Eve Macarro (Ana de Armas) from the John Wick spin-off film Ballerina (2025), the titular characters from Mike Judge's Beavis and Butt-Head TV series, and several horror film characters, including the Predator from the titular franchise, Jason Voorhees from the Friday the 13th franchise, and Chucky and Tiffany Valentine from the Child's Play franchise.

== Reception ==
Reception

Aggregate scores
Aggregator	Score
Metacritic	PS5: 82/100; Win: 83/100; XSXS: 83/100
OpenCritic	91% recommend

Review scores
Publication	Score
Digital Trends	3.5/5
Eurogamer	3/5
GameSpot	SP: 8/10; MP: 8/10; Zombies: 8/10
GamesRadar+	4/5
Hardcore Gamer	4/5
IGN	SP: 9/10; MP: 8/10; Zombies: 8/10
PC Gamer (US)	70/100
TechRadar	4.5/5
The Guardian	4/5
VG247	5/5

Black Ops 6 received "generally favorable reviews" from critics, according to the review aggregator website Metacritic. OpenCritic determined that 91% of critics recommended the game. Multiple publications considered the title to be an improvement over its direct predecessor, Call of Duty: Modern Warfare III (2023); some felt it was a return to form for the series.

Reviewers had a generally positive response towards Black Ops 6's campaign. IGN's Simon Cardy gave it a 9/10 rating, writing that it was a "hugely welcome reinvigoration" of the series. GameSpot's Phil Hornshaw praised the campaign's mission design and its cast of characters, but felt "lost" during some parts of its narrative. Eurogamer's Chris Tapsell wrote that Black Ops 6's campaign was "mostly excellent", and complimented its mission variety. Conversely, PC Gamer's Nova Smith considered the campaign to be "thoroughly mediocre" and "tedious". Some critics highlighted one mission, "Emergence", as a standout for its inclusion of horror elements and aspects of Call of Duty's Zombies mode. PCGamesN's Lauren Bergin wrote that the inclusion of zombies was a "perfect throughline that connects somewhat disparate modes", which was "outright cool to experience." GamesRadar+'s Andrew Brown described "Emergence" as Black Ops 6's most "subversive" level and felt its horror elements provided "moments of quiet unease" that he did not expect from a Call of Duty level.

The multiplayer component received praise from critics. VG247's Fran Ruiz wrote that Black Ops 6's multiplayer was "an absolute blast to play", and that it was the "most tight and polished the series has felt in more than a decade." IGN's Seth G. Macy praised the game's selection of maps, its gunplay, and the omnidirectional movement system, but felt the latter did not "necessarily help [him] competitively except in very specific situations." GameSpot's Hornshaw also praised the omnidirectional movement, stating that it creates "a really high degree of fluidity", but offered criticism towards the multiplayer's respawn system, which he felt was negatively affected by the "cramped" design of the game's maps. Both GamesRadar+'s Luke Kemp and Digital Trends's Billy Givens liked the game's perk system, with the latter writing that he appreciated the need to "consider the risk and rewards of choosing or abandoning perks [he'd] typically rolled with in previous games."

The Zombies mode was also met with positive reviews; critics liked the mode's return to its round-based gameplay format, as opposed to the mode's open world design in Modern Warfare III. IGN's Will Borger gave Zombies an 8/10 rating, stating that the mode is "absurd and campy and amazing and goofy in all the right ways"; he praised the mode's launch maps, "Terminus" and "Liberty Falls", and its hidden quests and Easter eggs, but disliked the "deeply annoying" dialogue for its characters. GamesRadar+'s Brown also praised the launch maps, and stated that Black Ops 6's version of Zombies revitalized his love for the mode as a whole. The Guardian's Keith Stuart wrote that Zombies was "fraught and incredibly stressful" but said that it was "a real blast" with friends. VG247's Ruiz felt Zombies "greatly benefits" from the omnidirectional movement system.

Following the release of the "Season 1 Reloaded" game update in December 2024, some players began accusing Activision and the developers of using generative artificial intelligence for several in-game items, including custom loading screens, calling cards, and emblems, and for artwork related to events in the Zombies mode; in particular, players highlighted a loading screen that depicted a zombified Santa Claus, which featured six fingers on one of his hands and other irregularities. Due to a requirement from Valve, Activision updated Call of Duty HQ's Steam page in January 2025 to disclose that generative AI tools are used to "help develop some in-game assets". The Gamer's Andrew King and Inverse's Trone Dowd condemned Activision for its usage of generative AI in Black Ops 6; the latter felt it was "doubly upsetting" due to the firings of many 2D artists during Microsoft's layoffs at Xbox and Activision Blizzard in 2024.

=== Sales ===
Black Ops 6 achieved the largest launch weekend in the franchise's history, and was the best-selling video game in the United States in 2024. Microsoft's CEO Satya Nadella noted high player engagement on release day and an increase in new Game Pass subscriptions within a single day. Sales on PlayStation and Steam increased by 60% compared to Modern Warfare III. By July 2025, Black Ops 6 reached 50 million players. According to Circana, Black Ops 6 is—within the United States—the fifth highest-grossing PlayStation game of all time, the eleventh overall best-selling title on the platform, and is the best-selling PlayStation 5 game since the console's launch in 2020.

=== Accolades ===
Date	Award	Category	Nominee(s)	Result	Ref.
December 12, 2024	The Game Awards	Best Audio Design	Call of Duty: Black Ops 6	Nominated	
December 12, 2024	The Game Awards	Innovation in Accessibility	Call of Duty: Black Ops 6	Nominated	
December 12, 2024	The Game Awards	Best Action Game	Call of Duty: Black Ops 6	Nominated	
December 12, 2024	The Game Awards	Best Multiplayer Game	Call of Duty: Black Ops 6	Nominated	
February 13, 2025	D.I.C.E. Awards	Action Game of the Year	Call of Duty: Black Ops 6	Nominated	
February 13, 2025	D.I.C.E. Awards	Online Game of the Year	Call of Duty: Black Ops 6	Nominated	
February 13, 2025	D.I.C.E. Awards	Outstanding Achievement in Animation	Call of Duty: Black Ops 6	Nominated	
March 19, 2025	Game Developers Choice Awards	Best Technology	Call of Duty: Black Ops 6	Honorable mention	
April 8, 2025	British Academy Games Awards	Animation	Call of Duty: Black Ops 6	Nominated	
April 8, 2025	British Academy Games Awards	Multiplayer	Call of Duty: Black Ops 6	Nominated	
April 8, 2025	British Academy Games Awards	Performer in a Leading Role	Y'lan Noel as Troy Marshall	Nominated	
April 8, 2025	British Academy Games Awards	Technical Achievement	Call of Duty: Black Ops 6	Nominated	

== Sequel ==
A sequel to Black Ops 6, titled Call of Duty: Black Ops 7, was released on November 14, 2025.
