= Call of Duty: World at War – Final Fronts =

2008 video game

- Developer: Rebellion Developments
- Publisher: Activision
- Composer: Sean Murray (reused from the base game)
- Series: Call of Duty
- Engine: Asura
- Platform: PlayStation 2
- Release: NA: November 11, 2008; AU: November 12, 2008; EU: November 14, 2008
- Genre: First-person shooter
- Mode: Single-player

Call of Duty: World at War – Final Fronts is a first-person shooter video game for the PlayStation 2 console, released in November 2008. It is the counterpart to Call of Duty: World at War and features 13 missions in total, set in World War II. It involves the U.S. fighting in the Pacific and the Battle of the Bulge in Europe, as well as the British advancing on the Rhine River into Germany. Final Fronts was developed by Rebellion Developments and published by Activision. It was the last Call of Duty game developed for the PlayStation 2.

== Gameplay ==
The gameplay is similar to earlier Call of Duty games; players can carry a total of two guns at one time, as well as grenades. Levels are played with a team of computer-controlled soldiers from both Britain and the U.S., that assist the player by shooting enemies and completing objectives. The missions range from infantry, infiltration, sniper missions, and large-scale assaults, to night fighting and tank assaults.

== Campaign ==
Final Fronts differs significantly from the main versions of the game. It features no multiplayer options, instead focusing on a three-part campaign mode, split up into 13 missions, set near the end of World War II. The player takes on the role of a U.S. Marine in the Pacific campaign, and both British and American soldiers in the two European campaigns.

The Pacific-based campaign sees Private Joe Miller (a reference to Call of Duty: World at War protagonist C. Miller), alongside Marines Sergeant Roebuck and Private Polonsky, fight their way through Japanese defenses in Guadalcanal, Betio, Saipan, and Okinawa. A major difference in this campaign, compared to other releases of World at War, is the fact that both Roebuck and Polonsky survive the final battle at Okinawa.

The European campaigns (which focused on the western front perspective instead of the eastern front) have three protagonists: Private Tom Sharpe of the British 6th Airborne Division, Private Lucas Gibson of the U.S. 80th Infantry Division, and Gunnery Sergeant Alex McCall who is featured in one tank mission. This set of missions sees the Americans and British move to relieve the city of Bastogne, and features the 6th Airborne Division capture the town of Wesel during Operation Varsity, as well as the Americans taking over Adolf Hitler's birthplace, Braunau am Inn in Austria.

== Development ==
Final Fronts was not developed by Treyarch, the studio that developed the other console versions of the game. Rather, its development was outsourced to British studio Rebellion Developments. Due to the PlayStation 2's hardware limitations, the game was built using the Asura engine, as opposed to the id Tech 3 engine used in the other versions. Some voice tracks were recycled from previous games of the series, predominantly the German voices. The character Sergeant Roebuck shares an ingame model with Sergeant Mike Dixon from Call of Duty 3, although he is voiced by Kiefer Sutherland, who also voices him in World at War.

== Reception ==
Reception

Review scores
Publication	Score
IGN	4.5/10
Jeuxvideo.com	10/20

Call of Duty: World at War – Final Fronts received mostly negative reviews from critics. It has been criticised by some reviewers for poor artificial intelligence, which is evident when friendly soldiers push the player out of cover and into the enemy line of fire.
