= Call of Duty: Black Ops – Zombies =

2011 video game

- The game's app icon
- Developer: Ideaworks Game Studio
- Publisher: Activision
- Series: Call of Duty
- Platforms: iOS; Android
- Release: iOS; December 1, 2011; Android; August 3, 2012
- Genre: First-person shooter
- Modes: Single-player, multiplayer

Call of Duty: Black Ops – Zombies is a spin-off game of the Call of Duty series' Zombies mode and the sequel to Call of Duty: World at War – Zombies. Developed by Ideaworks Game Studio and published by Activision for the iOS and Android platforms, it was launched in select countries on December 1, 2011.

== Reception ==
Reception

Aggregate score
| Aggregator | Score |
|---|---|
| Metacritic | 70/100 |

Review scores
| Publication | Score |
|---|---|
| Pocket Gamer | 4/5 |
| TouchArcade | 3.5/5 |
| Metro | 5/10 |

The iOS version received "mixed or average reviews" according to the review aggregation website Metacritic.
