= Call of Duty: World at War =

2008 video game

- Developer: Treyarch
- Publisher: Activision
- Director: Corky Lehmkuhl
- Producer: Pat Dwyer
- Designer: David Vonderhaar
- Artist: Colin Whitney
- Writer: Craig Houston
- Composer: Sean Murray
- Series: Call of Duty
- Engine: IW 3.0
- Platforms: PlayStation 3; Windows; Xbox 360; Wii
- Release: NA: November 11, 2008; AU: November 12, 2008; EU: November 14, 2008
- Genre: First-person shooter
- Modes: Single-player, multiplayer

Call of Duty: World at War is a 2008 first-person shooter game developed by Treyarch and published by Activision. It is the fifth main installment of the Call of Duty series and is the fourth entry in the series to be set during World War II. The game was announced by Activision in June 2008 and was released in November 2008 for the PlayStation 3, Windows, Xbox 360, and Wii. Other games under the World at War title were published for the Nintendo DS and the PlayStation 2, featuring different storylines and missions. The game's story, told primarily from the perspectives of U.S. Marine Raider Private C. Miller and Soviet Red Army Private Dimitri Petrenko, focuses on the Pacific and Eastern Front theaters of World War II.

Development for World at War took two years and began after the release of Treyarch's previous entry in the series, Call of Duty 3, which was also set during World War II. The game is based on an enhanced version of Infinity Ward's IW engine, with increased development on audio and visual effects. Treyarch used the engine to make more parts of certain environments destructible and introduce limb dismemberment and realistic burns to character models.

Upon release, World at War received positive reviews from critics, with praise directed at its intensity and violent nature, though some critics felt it was too similar to past Call of Duty titles. Retrospective reviews consider it one of the series' best World War II entries, with praise for the campaign's depiction of the brutality of World War II and the introduction of the Zombies mode. It became one of the best-selling titles of 2008, selling three million copies in the United States within the first two months of its release. It also marked the beginning of the Black Ops sub-series, as characters from World at War were carried over into its sequel, Call of Duty: Black Ops (2010).

== Gameplay ==
Call of Duty: World at War is a first-person shooter. It features more mature themes than previous Call of Duty installments and is open-ended, giving the player multiple ways to complete objectives, but otherwise generally plays like previous iterations of the franchise.

The game features a variety of different weapons and technology from World War II. Players gain access to these over the course of the game, but may only carry up to two weapons in addition to hand grenades. Weapons and ammo from fallen foes or friendlies can be picked up to replace weapons in a player's arsenal. Players can also find weapons with additional attachments, including guns equipped with rifle grenades, telescopic sights, and bayonets. When playing the Wii version of the game, the Wii Remote and Nunchuk is used to aim at enemies with motion controls.

A character can be positioned in one of three stances – standing, crouching, or prone – with each affecting the character's rate of movement, accuracy, and stealth. Using cover helps the player avoid enemy fire or recover health after taking significant damage, as there are no armor or health power-ups. When a player has taken damage, the edges of the screen glow red. If the player stays out of fire, they begin to regenerate health after a short time.

The single-player campaign includes Easter eggs in the form of thirteen hidden "death cards", represented by playing cards attached to makeshift war graves. There is one in each level (barring those that take place solely in vehicles); collecting them unlocks cheats for Co-op mode, such as reduced enemy endurance and "paintball mode".

Gameplay in the multiplayer's "War" mode played on the map "Roundhouse"

Call of Duty: World at War's multiplayer experience features eight modes, including Team Deathmatch and capture the flag. It also features vehicles and squad-based elements. Another mode, Ground War, offers team play of up to 18 players.

=== Nazi Zombies ===
The Xbox 360, PlayStation 3, and Windows versions of World at War feature the minigame Nazi Zombies. This is the first appearance of the "Zombies" mode in any Call of Duty game; the mode would eventually become a mainstay for any Call of Duty game developed by Treyarch. On completion of the final campaign mission, the first Zombies map, "Nacht der Untoten", will launch automatically.

In this survival mode, one to four players fight an unlimited number of waves of Nazi zombies (or, in the map "Shi No Numa", undead members of the Imperial Japanese Army), beginning with an M1911 pistol as their only weapon. Players earn points for killing zombies or repairing barricades in boarded-up windows. A player can spend accumulated points to expand areas of the map to access more useful weapons or purchase new weapons and upgrades. Zombies spawn in remote areas of the map and advance toward the players, routinely breaking the windows to enter and attack the players; if a player is attacked enough times, they fall and will need to be "revived" by another player in a certain time, or wait until the next round occurs to play again. If all players are damaged enough to fall, the game is over. As the game's DLC cycle continued, three additional Zombies maps were released, which added several new features to the mode. These features included "Perk-a-Colas", which are soda-themed upgrades, traps based on electro-shock therapy, and the "Pack-a-Punch" machine, which is used to upgrade weapons.

== Plot ==
=== American campaign ===
In August 1942, captured U.S. Marine Private C. Miller of the 1st Marine Division witnesses the torture and execution of his squad on Makin Island by the Imperial Japanese Army before he is rescued by a squad of Marine Raiders, led by Corporal Roebuck (Kiefer Sutherland) and Sergeant Tom Sullivan (Chris Fries), who then assault Japanese positions on the island. In September 1944, the squad participates in the Battle of Peleliu, now joined by Private Polonsky (Aaron Stanford). After breaking through the Japanese lines on the beach, Sullivan is fatally stabbed by a Japanese soldier, and Roebuck becomes sergeant. The squad fights its way through several Japanese positions, including mortar pits, and finally clears out a naval artillery post, allowing American ships to advance, and Peleliu eventually falls into American hands.

In April 1945, U.S. Navy Petty Officer Locke, in a PBY Catalina, takes part in a defensive operation alongside a U.S. Fifth Fleet taskforce, who are being attacked as part of Operation Ten-Go. Locke's crew works to rescue American sailors while fighting off Imperial Japanese Navy torpedo boats and Zeroes. They themselves are saved by a squadron of Vought F4U-1Cs that drive off the Zeroes just as the damaged Catalina runs out of ammunition.

In May 1945, Miller's squad assaults a Japanese position on Okinawa, the offensive culminating with an infantry attack on Shuri Castle. There several Japanese soldiers appear to surrender, but reveal concealed grenades when Roebuck and Polonsky attempt to search them; Miller is presented with the choice of saving either Roebuck or Polonsky. After airstrikes are carried out during the fighting, American forces capture Shuri Castle, eliminating the last bastion of Japanese resistance on Okinawa. The saved marine gives Miller the dog tags of the one who was killed.

=== Soviet campaign ===
In September 1942, Red Army Private Dimitri Petrenko of the 62nd Army awakes during the Battle of Stalingrad, in a fountain filled with corpses and wounded men, as he watches German troops execute his comrades. Injured Sergeant Viktor Reznov (Gary Oldman) enlists Dimitri's help in his mission to kill German General Heinrich Amsel, responsible for numerous war crimes across the Soviet Union. Over the course of the hunt, they link-up with other Soviet soldiers, who make an assault on Amsel's position. Dimitri and Reznov provide overwatch for the Soviet soldiers when they attack the post, managing to assassinate Amsel as he attempts to escape. Their position discovered, Dimitri and Reznov flee into the Volga.

In April 1945, during the Battle of the Seelow Heights, a captured Dimitri is saved from the Germans by the advancing 3rd Shock Army, which includes Reznov and Private Chernov (Craig Houston), who is reluctant to be wrathful towards the enemy as Reznov ordered. Dimitri, Reznov and other Soviet troops fight through several German positions and take part in a vehicular engagement using a T-34-85 tank before boarding a train to Berlin. They fight their way into the city and then enter a Berlin U-Bahn station, advancing through the tunnels and engaging their defenders in close quarters, until the Germans flood them in an attempt to eliminate the Soviets.

Reznov drags Dimitri out of the U-Bahn station and they take part in the Red Army's advance towards the Reichstag. During the assault at its entrance, Chernov is burned by a flamethrower and left to die. (Note: Reznov collects Chernov's journal, the contents of which change depending on the player's actions throughout the campaign—if the player frequently showed mercy toward German soldiers, Chernov will agree with Reznov's opinion of Dimitri's heroism; if the player showed a combination of mercy and brutality, Chernov will express confusion; if the player only showed brutality, Chernov will admonish Dimitri.) Reznov, Dimitri and the many Soviet soldiers enter the Reichstag, clearing it of German defenders, and finally reach the rooftop. Dimitri is shot by a German, whom Reznov brutally kills with a machete. Although wounded, Dimitri plants the Soviet flag, signaling Soviet victory and ending the war in Europe.

== Development ==
World at War was announced on June 23, 2008, by Activision, who confirmed that the game was to be released in fall 2008, and that the series would revert to its customary World War II setting. The game took about two years to make, twice as long as Treyarch's previous entry to the series, Call of Duty 3. The game is powered by an improved version of the Call of Duty 4: Modern Warfare engine, with several improvements made to the physics model. Environments are more destructible and can be set on fire with the flamethrower, whose fire propagates. Dismemberment, as well as realistic skin and clothes burning of the characters, were added. Exakt Entertainment assisted in porting the game in this engine to the Wii, while Arkane Studios assisted in the creation of levels for the multiplayer mode under the direction of Austin based studio Certain Affinity.

Not long after, Treyarch released the modding tools for Call of Duty: World at War. These tools were the same ones used to create all the other Call of Duty games, but with slight changes version to version, which can be downloaded online. Kiefer Sutherland and Gary Oldman were cast as voice actors for the game. Sutherland voices the narrator and squad leader of the American campaign, Sergeant Roebuck, while Oldman voices that of the Soviet campaign, Sergeant Viktor Reznov. A full-sized replica PBY Catalina was constructed for motion capture use.

=== Audio ===
The music for Call of Duty: World at War was composed by Sean Murray. He had worked with Brian Tuey, Treyarch's audio director, on True Crime: New York City, the sequel to the first True Crime: Streets of LA. Murray said Tuey "knew [he] would bring a fresh approach to Call of Duty: World at War". Adam Levenson, the audio director of Activision, was called in to help them. Murray said that he wanted to make the music more fun and intense, but also "a specific musical path that follows the psyche of the gameplay".

The new technology of occlusion, which changes the sound made by nearby object depending on objects blocking its path e.g. walls, was added to World at War. The game has various levels of "muffled" sound depending on the objects it travels through e.g. a more muffled sound through a thick wall compared to a slightly muffled sound through a thin short wall. For the first time in a Call of Duty game, players are able to tell the difference between someone walking next to the player and someone walking above or below the player, as well as telling the difference between a shot fired in the distance and a shot fired close by, but behind a solid object.

The other technology of Flux was also developed using field recording systems. The World at War crew traveled to a desert with mountains on both sides of the range to test the frequencies of sounds made by World War II weapons. Microphones were placed 60 yards (55 m) behind and 60 yards in front of the gun to test the echoes. This was later replicated and developed in the studio for the game software. It allows players to pinpoint a sniper rifle shot, as it reflects off them, as well as hearing the initial "pop" of a hand grenade blowing up and then the grenade's loud "whoosh" sound that begins where the grenade blew up, and ends behind the player. The flux system also combines with the occlusion system.

== Marketing and release ==
The first trailer for the game premiered on Xbox Live on June 21, 2008, and arrived on PlayStation Network five days later. A beta version of the game's online multiplayer mode was released for the Xbox 360 on October 10, 2008. A PC version of the beta was later released on October 28, 2008. Those who pre-ordered the game at GameStop, Game and EB Games in Australia or North America or who are members of the Call of Duty official website were given codes which allowed them to download both beta versions of the game. Coinciding with the release of the game, McFarlane Toys produced four action figures. Three are different varieties of US Marine Corps infantry, and the fourth is a British Special Ops soldier.

A collector's edition of World at War includes bonus items, including a stainless steel canteen imprinted with the Call of Duty series logo and a metal storage tin. The collector's edition also gives players access to an unlockable weapon and the opportunity to earn double experience points (XP) in the online multiplayer mode, as well as a specially colored clan tag to denote the player's VIP status. This edition of the game is only available for the Microsoft Windows and Xbox 360 platforms.

=== Downloadable content ===
An update was made available to the Xbox 360 and PlayStation 3 versions on February 26, 2009, as well as the addition of a new multiplayer map, Makin Day. The update included several bug fixes which removed glitches in several multiplayer maps and player movements, and provided more information in the stats display. The Makin Day map was released for Microsoft Windows on February 6, 2009, in the downloadable patch 1.2. Makin Day has a similar layout as the existing Makin map, but includes subtle changes such as daylight, reflected in the tide being out along the shoreline as well as some reworked areas of the map.

On March 18, 2009, Activision and Treyarch announced that downloadable content (DLC) was under development for World at War, titled Map Pack 1. This first installment of DLC was released on March 19, 2009, for the PlayStation 3 and Xbox 360, while the Windows version received the DLC at a later date. The map pack includes three new multiplayer maps and one new Nazi Zombies map, entitled "Zombie Verrückt" (German: zombie crazy). The map is based on the multiplayer map Asylum, in turn based on the asylum in the campaign mission Ring of Steel. The map includes new weapons and power-ups intended to expand the experience. Players can turn on a power generator that reunites both sides of the map and enables "Perk-a-Cola" machines. The new multiplayer map called "Nightfire" takes places at night in the streets of a bombed-out area of Berlin. The "Knee Deep" map is in the jungle of Peleliu and contains fortified huts and streams. "Station" is located in a ruined underground train station in Berlin featuring subway cars and hidden passages. IGN reported that Map Pack 1 sold over 1 million copies in the first week of availability, setting an Xbox Live record for the number of downloads in a week.

On April 30, 2009, Activision and Treyarch announced Map Pack 2, which was released on June 11. Map Pack 2 contains an additional four multiplayer maps. "Shi No Numa" (Japanese: 死の沼, lit. 'Swamp of Death') is a new map on the Nazi Zombies co-op mode, set in a misty swamp-land surrounded by jungle. The map takes place in the Japanese-occupied Dutch East Indies and new features include flaming hellhounds, the Wunderwaffe DG-2 weapon and 10 new PlayStation Network Trophies and Xbox Live achievements. The map also introduced four new playable characters who have appeared in many subsequent Treyarch Zombie maps: Tank Dempsey of the U.S.M.C, Nikolai Belinski of the Red Army, Nazi Doctor Edward Richtofen and Takeo Masaki of the Imperial Japanese Army. The multiplayer map "Banzai" is set in a jungle featuring a river bridge, villages, a waterfall and hidden caves. The "Corrosion" map is set in a run-down train yard in Russia, featuring broken pipelines and train cars. The "Sub Pens" map is located in a bombed-out Japanese submarine base with heavy rain.

On July 20, 2009, Activision and Treyarch announced Map Pack 3, which was released on August 6, 2009. This DLC also consists of three new multiplayer maps and a new Nazi Zombies map. The three multiplayer maps are "Battery", which takes place on an abandoned coastal artillery battery Pacific; "Breach", which is set in the overcrowded streets of Berlin, Germany near the Brandenburg Gate; and "Revolution", which is based on an industrialized city in Russia. The new Nazi Zombies map, "Der Riese" which means "The Giant" in English, is based in a factory in Breslau where "Element 115" is being processed and used to build teleporters and other mysterious devices, such as the "Pack-a-Punch Machine", which upgrades guns, such as the Wunderwaffe DG-2. New weapons such as Monkey Bombs were also added. This map also heavily expanded the official backstory to Zombies mode, which is continued into Call of Duty: Black Ops. The packs were paid DLC for the Xbox 360 and PS3.

=== Other versions ===
Call of Duty: World at War was released for the Nintendo DS on November 11, 2008, in North America, and on November 14 in Europe. It was published by Activision and developed by n-Space, who used the same game engine as their previous title, Call of Duty 4: Modern Warfare. The game's story is also based on World War II's Pacific theater and Eastern front. Up to four players can be supported online with four different types of game, as well as perks and rank-ups. Compared to Modern Warfare, it has improved in-level geometry, has more responsive sprints and crouches and 3D-modeled guns instead of 2D sprites. However, the flamethrower, which is new to the series, is rendered with 2D sprites. The frame rate is just under 30 and features voice-overs during the missions. Players are able to defuse mines and send Morse code with the touch screen, as well as using mortar rounds, an anti-air gun from a battleship, parachuting and using mounted guns. There is also a tank mode which allows the player to turn the main gun and fire machine gun rounds at the same time.

Call of Duty: World at War – Final Fronts was released for the PlayStation 2 on November 11, 2008. Developed by Rebellion Developments, it features missions set near the end of World War II across different campaigns. Aside from the campaigns in the Pacific and Western to Central Europe, Final Fronts also includes a campaign involving the British advance on the Rhine River.

Call of Duty: World at War – Zombies was released for the iPhone and iPod Touch on November 16, 2009, by Activision, Treyarch, and Ideaworks Game Studio. The game is based on the Nazi Zombies mode, and featured a tutorial map and maps called Nacht der Untoten, Shi No Numa and Der Riese, with a downloadable map named Zombie Verrückt. Call of Duty: World at War was also released for the Windows Mobile; however, the game features a run and gun genre similar to Commando from Capcom rather than a first-person shooter, a different storyline, and a different set of characters. The game was developed by Glu Mobile and published by Activision.

== Reception ==
Reception

Aggregate score
Aggregator	Score
Metacritic	(PC) 83/100 (PS3) 85/100 (Wii) 83/100 (X360) 84/100

Review scores
Publication	Score
1Up.com	B
Game Informer	8.75/10
GameSpot	8.5/10
GameTrailers	8.7/10 (Wii) 8.2/10
IGN	9.2/10 (Wii) 8.0/10
Nintendo Power	8.0/10
Official Nintendo Magazine	92%
Official Xbox Magazine (UK)	9/10
Official Xbox Magazine (US)	7.5/10
PC Gamer (UK)	77%
X-Play	4/5

Award
Publication	Award
Golden Joystick Awards	Official Nintendo Magazine Nintendo Game of the Year; MSN Multiplayer Game of the Year

=== Critical response ===
Call of Duty: World at War received "generally favorable" reviews, according to review aggregator website Metacritic. Describing the game as a whole, GameSpot's Chris Watters stated that by returning to the World War II setting, "World at War achieves greatness but falls short of excellence". Jason Ocampo, writing for IGN, concluded that World at War was a "solid, confident shooter with plenty to offer the casual and hardcore alike". Ryan McCaffrey of Official Xbox Magazine described the game as being more like an expansion pack rather than a full game.

Ocampo applauded Treyarch for its decision to stage World at War in the Pacific theater of World War II. The addition of a co-op mode was also complimented as helping to increase the game's replayability, and the multiplayer mode was described as "definitely an area where World at War shines". Some positive points noted by Watters include the "well-acted dialogue" of the characters Sergeant Roebuck and Sergeant Reznov, as well as the solid and fast-paced single-player/co-op campaign.

Ocampo criticized the scope of the campaign, arguing that it hurt the continuity of the plot due to some missions taking place several months after others and disrupting the flow of the narrative. McCaffrey's main criticism was that Treyarch had not expanded upon the success of Call of Duty 4: Modern Warfare, but had instead created a "play-it-safe sequel" that used elements of Call of Duty 4 but added "nothing noteworthy of its own". Other disappointments McCaffrey expressed included the lack of excitement in the campaign storyline and the few differences between the Pacific theater missions and European theater missions. Watters criticized the game's use of "well-worn source material" and "déjà vu" game mechanics, also implying its similarity to the Call of Duty series' other games, but praised the darker, grittier portrayal of the World War II settings.

Anthony Gallegos, writing for 1Up.com, thought the horror of the game is "almost too much at times". Gallegos complimented the significantly increased graphic violence and gore as a significant improvement in realism, and thought it portrayed World War II "more accurately than ever before". Matt Bertz of Game Informer felt the game's "short bursts of genuine gameplay" made the rest of the game "all the more disappointing", while Scott Alan Mariott of Xplay highlighted the game's addition of co-op play, the first for a Call of Duty game.

In an analysis of the portrayal of World War II in first-person shooters, academic Debra Ramsay felt that the game limited its narrative of the war to combat and "ignored the civilian face of suffering". While she thought first-person shooters such as World at War had potential to examine the effects of war in a way other media portrayals could not, she asserted that the game "is an extreme iteration of narratives of the conflict that reduce World War II to nothing other than combat and its effects on soldiers". Keith Stuart of The Guardian was also concerned with the game's portrayal of World War II, arguing that video game developers needed to be careful in how they portrayed real-life events.

Call of Duty: World at War won the MSN Multiplayer Game of the Year and Official Nintendo Magazine Nintendo Game of the Year awards at the 27th Golden Joystick Awards. During the 12th Annual Interactive Achievement Awards, the Academy of Interactive Arts & Sciences nominated World at War for "Action Game of the Year" and "Outstanding Achievement in Online Gameplay".

=== Reassessment ===
Retrospective assessments of Call of Duty: World at War have been mostly positive, with some critics calling it one of the series' best entries with the World War II setting. In lists ranking the series' games, World at War has generally ranked in the top 10. (Note: Attributed to multiple references:) The game has received particular praise for its horror elements. NME thought it did a "surprisingly good job at being scary", complimenting some sections for "channeling some genuinely spooky energy into their warfare". Several commentators noted the use of blood and gore in the campaign, with many believing that Treyarch successfully recreated the horrors of World War II. (Note: Attributed to multiple references:) NME criticized the campaign's high difficulty, which they believed made it frustrating.

World at War is generally remembered as the introduction of Zombies, a fan-favorite mode that became a mainstay in the Call of Duty series. (Note: Attributed to multiple references:) The game's multiplayer was also praised by some critics for building upon the conventions set by Modern Warfare, although others felt it did not distinguish itself enough from its predecessor.

=== Sales ===
Call of Duty: World at War was the second best-selling game for November 2008 in the United States, selling over 1.41 million units on the Xbox 360. The Xbox 360 and PlayStation 3 versions were the second and ninth best-selling game of December 2008 in the United States, selling in excess of 1.33 million and 533,000 copies respectively. The Xbox 360 version was the sixth best-selling game of 2008, selling in excess of 2.75 million copies. The Wii version ranked as the 19th best-selling game and the seventh best-selling Wii game of December 2008 in the United States. It received particular interest in the United Kingdom, where it doubled the amount of first-week sales compared to Modern Warfare on the PS3 and Xbox 360. It also became the third fastest-selling video game in the UK behind Grand Theft Auto IV and Grand Theft Auto: San Andreas. The Xbox 360 version of World at War received a "Double Platinum" sales award from the Entertainment and Leisure Software Publishers Association (ELSPA), indicating sales of at least 600,000 copies in the United Kingdom. ELSPA gave the PlayStation 3 release a "Platinum" certification for sales of at least 300,000 copies in the region. As of November 2013, the game has sold 15.7 million copies.
