= Call of Duty: Black Ops Cold War =

2020 video game

- Developers: Treyarch; Raven Software (Note: Windows version developed by Beenox. Additional development work by High Moon Studios, Activision Shanghai, Demonware, and Sledgehammer Games.)
- Publisher: Activision
- Directors: Dan Vondrak; Corky Lehmkuhl
- Producer: Natalie Pohorski
- Designer: David Vonderhaar
- Writers: David S. Goyer; Craig Houston; Murray Kraft
- Composer: Jack Wall
- Series: Call of Duty
- Engine: IW (modified)
- Platforms: PlayStation 4; PlayStation 5; Windows; Xbox One; Xbox Series X/S
- Release: November 13, 2020
- Genre: First-person shooter
- Modes: Single-player, multiplayer

Call of Duty: Black Ops Cold War is a 2020 first-person shooter game co-developed by Treyarch and Raven Software and published by Activision. It is the seventeenth main installment of the Call of Duty series and is the sixth entry in the Black Ops sub-series, following Call of Duty: Black Ops 4 (2018). Set in 1981, Black Ops Cold War's single-player story follows CIA operative Russell Adler and his team of agents as they hunt down a Soviet spy named Perseus. As with previous Call of Duty titles, the game also includes a multiplayer component and the cooperative Zombies mode.

Development on Black Ops Cold War began as a collaboration between Raven and Sledgehammer Games, which was not intended to be an entry in the Black Ops sub-series, but due to disagreements between the two studios, Activision assigned Treyarch as a lead developer on the title in May 2019. Marketing for Black Ops Cold War began in August 2020 and was done in different forms, including cryptic messages within Call of Duty: Warzone, puzzles made to be solved online by fans, and a website showcasing historical Cold War events; a full reveal debuted on August 26, as part of an in-game event in Warzone. The game was released on November 13, 2020, for PlayStation 4, PlayStation 5, Windows, Xbox One, and Xbox Series X/S.

Upon release, Black Ops Cold War received generally favorable reviews from critics, and became the best-selling title of 2020 in the United States. Reviewers responded mostly positively to the single-player campaign and Zombies, but were mixed on the game's multiplayer component, with some deeming it to be weaker than the one featured in its direct predecessor, Call of Duty: Modern Warfare (2019). A sequel, titled Call of Duty: Black Ops 6, was released in October 2024.

== Gameplay ==
Black Ops Cold War's single-player campaign features a safe house, where players are able to review evidence, interact with NPCs, and plan out missions via an evidence board.

As with previous Call of Duty games, Black Ops Cold War is a first-person shooter, featuring a single-player campaign, a multiplayer component, and the cooperative Zombies mode. The campaign gives players the ability to create their own custom character; players can choose their intelligence agency, skin tone, nationality, and gender, as well as different personality traits that provide in-game perks. Its missions feature a non-linear design, which gives players multiple ways to approach a mission's objectives. In-between missions, players are able to access a safe house, where they are able to review various pieces of evidence, interact with non-player characters (NPCs), and plan out subsequent missions via an evidence board. Black Ops Cold War also features multiple endings, which depend on several choices that the player has to make throughout the campaign.

The game's multiplayer component introduces three new game modes: "VIP Escort", "Combined Arms", and "Fireteam: Dirty Bomb", in addition to Call of Duty's standard modes, such as "Team Deathmatch", "Domination", and "Hardpoint". VIP Escort puts two teams of six against each other; one team is tasked with escorting their VIP—a randomly selected player from the team—to one of two exfiltration sites, while the other team must eliminate the VIP. After a round is completed, the teams switch sides; the first team to score four points will win the match. Combined Arms puts two teams of twelve on large-scale maps, which feature transport vehicles to aid players in navigating the maps, and tasks them with taking control of five to six capture zones; the first team to reach 400 points will win the match. Fireteam: Dirty Bomb puts ten teams of four against each other on large maps, and tasks them with collecting and depositing uranium in various dirty bombs; the team that destroys the most dirty bombs will win the match. Like previous Call of Duty titles, players must progress through 55 player levels in order to unlock various items for their loadouts, such as weapons, perks and "scorestreaks"; unlocked weapons can be customized via the "Gunsmith"—a returning feature from Call of Duty: Modern Warfare (2019)—which allows them to equip various weapon attachments, such as foregrips, barrels, and optics.

=== Zombies ===
In Zombies, one to four players—who are part of a CIA-backed response team named "Requiem"—fight off endless hordes of the undead, which increase in both number and difficulty with every completed round. Zombies features four main round-based maps: "Die Maschine", "Firebase Z", "Mauer der Toten", and "Forsaken". In order to unlock all parts of the maps, players must purchase several doors with "Essence" points. Essence can also be used to purchase various player upgrades, including perks, weapon damage upgrades—which are acquired from the "Pack-a-Punch" machine—and ammo modifications. Players can also earn "salvage" materials, which can be used to craft various pieces of equipment, obtain armor, and increase a weapon's level of rarity. As in the multiplayer component, players can bring their own customized weapon with them into a match; previous Zombies modes only allowed players to start a match with a pistol. Starting at the end of round 10, and every five rounds afterwards, players can choose to exfiltrate from the map via helicopter; should players choose to exfil, they will have a limited amount of time to head to an efxil point, where they must kill every zombie in the area before they can exfiltrate. Successful exfiltrations reward players with "Aetherium Crystals", which can be used to permanently upgrade various player items, including perks, weapon classes, and ammo mods.

Supplementing the core round-based maps are three additional game modes: "Dead Ops Arcade 3", "Onslaught", and "Outbreak". Played from a top-down perspective, Dead Ops Arcade 3 tasks players with completing a series of "Arenas", which culminate in a boss fight. Onslaught puts two players on a selection of maps from Black Ops Cold War's multiplayer, tasking them to defend areas grounded off by a "Dark Aether" orb, which must be powered by killing zombies. Onslaught was initially exclusive to players on PlayStation 4 and PlayStation 5; the mode was made available to all other platforms in November 2021. Outbreak puts players on a large zone situated in the Ural Mountains and tasks them with completing a selection of main and side objectives. Once the main objective is completed, players can choose to exfil from the zone or warp to a new, harder zone.

== Plot ==
=== Campaign ===
In January 1981, CIA operatives Russell Adler (Bruce Thomas), Alex Mason (Chris Payne Gilbert), and Frank Woods (Damon Victor Allen) are sent to Amsterdam to target Qasim Javadi (Farshad Farahat) and Arash Kadivar (Navid Negahban) for their roles in the Iran hostage crisis. With intelligence gained from interrogating Qasim, the trio tracks Arash to an airfield in Turkey, where they witness him executing everyone in the vehicle he arrived in. The team eliminates Arash's men and corners him; he gloats that the Soviet spy Perseus (William Salyers)—who Adler believed to be dead—was the one responsible for organizing the hostage crisis before being executed. After being briefed of his threat by Adler and Jason Hudson (Piotr Michael), U.S. President Ronald Reagan (Jeff Bergman) authorizes a black operation to neutralize Perseus.

Adler's team consists of MI6 intelligence officer Helen Park (Lily Cowles), CIA operative Lawrence Sims (Reggie Watkins), and Mossad operative Eleazar "Lazar" Azoulay (Damon Dayoub), with Mason and Woods providing tactical support. The final member of the team is an agent known by the codename "Bell", who allegedly served with Adler and Sims in MACV-SOG during the Vietnam War. Operating out of a safe house in West Berlin, the team asks Bell to recall Operation Fracture Jaw in 1968, where Adler says he, Bell, and Sims first encountered Perseus. Afterwards, the team proceeds to East Berlin to apprehend/kill Anton Volkov (Rafael Petardi), a Russian mafia boss with ties to Perseus.

The team learns that Volkov helped Perseus smuggle a nuclear device through East Berlin; they also find encrypted coordinates to an unpopulated region within Ukraine. Bell and Woods are sent to these coordinates, where they infiltrate a secret Spetsnaz facility and discover that Perseus has infiltrated "Operation Greenlight": a top-secret American program that planted neutron bombs in every major European city to deny their use to the Soviets in the event of an invasion. Intel retrieved from the Spetsnaz facility indicates that Perseus is excavating General Nikita Dragovich's destroyed base in the Ural Mountains, which was used for the development of the "Nova 6" bio-weapon. (Note: As depicted in Call of Duty: Black Ops (2010)) Mason and Woods are deployed there to retrieve Dragovich's list of American sleeper agents, but find that Perseus has wiped the data from the base's mainframe; this forces Adler and Bell to infiltrate the Lubyanka Building to retrieve the list. The duo learns that a Greenlight scientist is one of the sleeper agents and has fled to Cuba, where the team follows. The team discovers that Perseus has managed to steal the detonation codes for every Greenlight bomb, meaning he can devastate Europe and lay the blame on the United States. They come under fire and Lazar and Park are injured, leaving Bell only enough time to save one of them.

After rescuing Bell, Adler continues to press them by provoking their memories of Vietnam once more. At this point, Bell's true identity is revealed as an agent of Perseus, having been shot by Arash in Turkey. Adler found Bell and brainwashed them using Project MKUltra into believing they were his ally. With Bell's memory returned, Adler interrogates them on the location of Perseus' headquarters. Bell can either choose to remain loyal to Perseus and lie to Adler, or choose to betray Perseus and reveal his location. Should Bell choose the former option, they will tell Adler to go to the Duga radar array, where he and his team will be too far away to stop Perseus from activating the nukes and, if they have previously sent a warning to the Soviets, Bell will eliminate their former allies. Otherwise, Bell betrays Perseus and joins the CIA in their assault on Perseus' headquarters in the Solovetsky Islands, where they destroy the transmitters needed to send the detonation signal. Later, Adler takes Bell out for a conversation, assuring them that their choice to turn against Perseus was of their own free will and that they are a hero, before eliminating them as they are a loose end.

=== Multiplayer ===
In January 1984, a Perseus cell led by Vikhor "Stitch" Kuzmin (Chris Parson) raids Adler's safe house in West Berlin to gain intel on him. Stitch, who oversaw the production of Nova 6 on Rebirth Island, vowed vengeance on Adler after he captured and tortured him during the CIA's assault on the island in 1968. He leaves a message that leads Adler's team to a mall in New Jersey, where they are ambushed. The team tries to escape, but Adler is captured by Stitch's men. Three months later, Woods leads a squad to Laos, where Adler was last sighted, but finds that he's been moved to Verdansk, Kastovia, where Stitch intends to use data related to Dragovich's numbers program to try and brainwash Adler. Hudson authorizes a search and rescue operation to retrieve Adler; within several days, Woods and his team manage to locate and rescue Adler.

In June 1984, Stitch orders Perseus operative Owethu "Jackal" Mabuza (Gabe Kunda) to assault a Jumpseat Satellite Ground Station in South Africa. The station's surviving specialist is forced to de-orbit two CIA satellites, which crash in Verdansk and Algeria, respectively. Following his recovery, Adler leads an assault on the satellite crash in Algeria, during which Adler secretly recovers a data recorder from the satellite debris. The following month, Woods leads a response team to an ECHELON Listening Station in Teufelsburg, where he attempts to apprehend Perseus operative Kaori "Kitsune" Tanaka (Erika Ishii) but is forced to flee after she uses the numbers protocol to turn Woods's team against him. Afterwards, Hudson meets with Woods and reveals an inconsistency in Adler's report about the data recorder from the Algeria crash site, as well as his recent unmonitored activities in Verdansk. Recognizing that Adler may have been compromised, Hudson orders Woods to contact Mason for help.

In August 1984, as Mason and Hudson torture Adler in order to break his programming, Stitch and Perseus operative Benito "Fuze" Ortega attempt, but fail, to defuse several explosive charges that Adler planted across Verdansk. Woods, Adler, Mason and Hudson are deployed at a heavily destroyed Verdansk to confront Stitch. They eventually find him in a forest, where Adler learns that Stitch took over the mantle of Perseus from his predecessor, who died from cancer in 1983. Having finished his work, Stitch willingly surrenders himself, while taunting Adler of his actions; a gunshot is heard as the scene cuts to black.

=== Zombies ===
No.	Title	Original release date
1	"Die Maschine"	November 13, 2020
In November 1983, acting on intelligence obtained from rogue BND agent Samantha Maxis (Julie Nathanson), the CIA task force "Requiem" deploys a four-person strike team to a World War II-era Nazi nuclear research facility, known as "Projekt Endstation", in Morasko, Poland, to investigate recent activity there by the Soviet-led "Omega Group". Working closely with Requiem's senior staff—Special Officer Grigori Weaver (Gene Farber), Doctors Elizabeth Grey (Amy Pemberton) and Oskar Strauss (Thure Riefenstein), Major Mackenzie Carver (Keston John), and Captain Stoney "Raptor One" Maddox (Derek Phillips)—the strike team encounters waves of zombies and the facility's malfunctioning particle accelerator, which has opened several global gateways to the "Dark Aether" dimension. Upon further investigation, the strike team uncovers a device in the facility called "Der Wechsler", which can restore a zombie's brain functionality, and uses it on one of the roaming zombies in the facility, who was a former Omega Group member named Orlov; in turn, he agrees to help the team close the dimensional rift. Orlov successfully seals the rift, destroying the Endstation facility and sacrificing himself in the process, while allowing the strike team to escape.
2	"Firebase Z"	February 4, 2021
In June 1984, Maxis travels to Outpost 25, an Omega Group facility located in A Sầu Valley, Vietnam. There, she hopes to make contact with Sergei Ravenov (Andrew Morgado), a Spetsnaz captain who has lost faith in Omega and wishes to help Maxis stop them, but she is captured by Omega and is thrown into the Dark Aether by Dr. William Peck (Zeke Alton), an American scientist who defected to Omega. Upon learning of Maxis' capture, Ravenov contacts Weaver and requests that he send Requiem's strike team to Outpost 25 to free Maxis. On June 15, the Requiem strike team is deployed in Vietnam and makes contact with Ravenov, who guides them through the undead-infested facility. After learning from Peck of Maxis' current situation, the strike team attempts to open a portal and stabilize it long enough for Maxis to escape the dimension. They eventually succeed and exfiltrate with Maxis, while Ravenov elects to remain undercover as Omega continues their operations in the Ural Mountains. Afterwards, Omega's leaders, Colonel Lev Kravchenko (Andrew Divoff) and Dr. Aleksandra Valentina (Sadie Alexandru), travel to Outpost 25 to confront Peck about his failure.
3	"Outbreak: Operation Threshold"	February 25, 2021
In an effort to catch up to Omega Group's progress, Requiem launches "Operation Threshold", a large-scale mission across the Ural Mountains, where the largest outbreak zones have been identified. Over the next several months, Requiem's strike team is deployed in multiple Ural regions in order to eliminate undead targets, capture specimen and commence further research on the mysterious "Aetherium" element. Meanwhile, Maxis is quarantined under isolation due to her time spent inside the Dark Aether. Amidst the operations at the Ural Mountains, both Requiem and Omega come into contact with Kazimir Zykov (Andrew Morgado), a Soviet engineer who helped the Red Army shut down the Endstation facility in 1945, but has been trapped inside the Dark Aether since then. Zykov, who wishes to escape the dimension, has attempted to reach out to the real world, giving both Requiem and Omega warnings of a mysterious entity commanding the undead forces from within.
4	"Outbreak: Operatsiya Inversiya"	May 20, 2021
In November 1984, Maxis secretly contacts the Requiem strike team during their mission, requesting them to meet with Ravenov. At a missile silo in the "Ruka" region, Ravenov reveals that Peck has been using Aetherium crystals to supercharge nuclear warheads, which would allow Omega Group to create new outbreak zones wherever they choose. Not wishing to let either side possess the warheads, Maxis instructs Ravenov and the strike team to direct the warheads toward the Pacific Ocean, where they can be safely dumped. After clearing out a massive zombie horde guarding the silo, the strike team succeeds in deploying the warheads and is exfiltrated from the area by Raptor One.
5	"Outbreak: Operation Excision"	June 17, 2021
The following month, Ravenov contacts Weaver via Maxis' secret radio channel, and requests Requiem's help in extracting several Omega scientists who wish to defect from the group; though angry at Ravenov and Maxis' secrecy, Weaver agrees to help him. Shortly afterwards, the strike team receives intel from Ravenov that he has lost contact with the scientists. The team is sent to the State Sanatorium U-23 to investigate a crash site and help extract the scientists; however, they were all murdered by Dr. Hugo Jager, an Omega scientist who was secretly a mole planted by Kravchenko to root out the defectors. The strike team attempts to exfil, but is captured by Kravchenko and Omega forces. Meanwhile, Valentina continues to further her own agenda: to open a gateway to the Dark Aether in hopes of freeing her father, who seemingly has been communicating with her from the other side since her childhood. Omega Group eventually deduces Valentina's real identity as Angelika Vogel, the daughter of Projekt Endstation's head scientist, Ulrich Vogel.
6	"Mauer der Toten"	July 15, 2021
In February 1985, an outbreak occurs in East Berlin, where Valentina was last sighted. Having learned of her true allegiance, Kravchenko deploys Requiem's strike team at the Berlin site to stop her, while overseeing their mission, using Raptor One as leverage. Kravchenko and the strike team learn that Valentina has been mutated with Dark Aether energy by "the Forsaken", the entity mentioned by Zykov, who was also masquerading as Vogel to trick Valentina into doing his bidding. With Omega Group's instructions and the assistance of "Klaus" (Dave B. Mitchell), a combat robot customized with an artificial intelligence module created by the Director of Requiem, (Note: Identified off-screen as a new version of legacy Zombies character Edward Richtofen) the strike team constructs a miniature Aetherium warhead using components left onsite by the CIA at an abandoned safe house. Valentina tries to stop them, but is ultimately defeated, and her energy is used to refine the Aetherium for the warhead. As the Forsaken taunts Requiem of his imminent arrival, Klaus carries the warhead through the portal. Kravchenko attempts to betray the strike team at the last minute, but Maxis uses her Dark Aether powers to open a portal, allowing the team to escape. Meanwhile, the Director monitors Maxis and sends a group memo to an unknown recipient, noting her growing power as a concern towards "Project Janus".
7	"Forsaken"	October 7, 2021
As Operation Threshold expands into the North Atlantic Sea and Algeria, the Director continues to pressure Maxis in isolation, coercing her into using her powers. Meanwhile, both Omega Group and Requiem authorize new operations to free Zykov from the Dark Aether. On June 4, 1985, the Requiem strike team is deployed to an Omega test site in Ukraine, where Kravchenko and Peck are conducting the final steps to open a Dark Aether gateway. They succeed in freeing Zykov, only to learn that he was the Forsaken all along. As Kravchenko and Peck attempt to escape the facility, Maxis and the strike team make their final stand against the Forsaken. Eventually, Maxis sacrifices herself by plunging into a Dark Aether portal, weakening the Forsaken enough for him to be captured by Omega's containment chamber. With the Forsaken defeated, all global outbreak zones are collapsed, and the undead threat is contained. The Director then orders Requiem to be shut down, and its department leads, including Weaver, Grey, Carver, and Strauss, apprehended alongside the strike team and Raptor One, while the Forsaken's chamber is delivered to an unknown location. Five years later, Peck travels to Japan and charters a boat to the middle of the Pacific Ocean, claiming that he is looking for "some old friends".

== Development ==
Black Ops Cold War was co-developed by Treyarch and Raven Software, with Treyarch leading production on the multiplayer and Zombies modes and Raven developing the single-player campaign. According to reports from Jason Schreier, the title originally began development as a collaboration between Raven and Sledgehammer Games, which was not intended to be an entry in the Black Ops sub-series, but due to frequent disagreements between the two studios, Activision chose to assign Treyarch to work on the project in May 2019. Some Treyarch employees told Schreier that they were not pleased to learn that the studio was taking up the game's development, and said that they were "bracing for brutal overtime hours", similar to what they faced during the development of their previous project, Call of Duty: Black Ops 4 (2018). Schreier also said that Treyarch would be the sole lead developer for the game, while Sledgehamer and Raven would act as support studios; Activision revealed in August 2020 that Treyarch and Raven were co-developing the title, with Raven confirming that they were leading Black Ops Cold War's campaign later that month. The game's total production budget amounted to over US$700 million. Black Ops Cold War was developed on a heavily modified and upgraded version of the IW engine that the studio used since Call of Duty: Black Ops III, coinciding with the release of the ninth generation of video game consoles.

=== Music ===
Jack Wall composed the score for Black Ops Cold War, after writing music for several Black Ops games, including Call of Duty: Black Ops II (2012). Wall was excited to learn that the game would be set during the 1980s, as he felt that much of his previous musical work, including his scores for the Mass Effect games, was influenced by that era. Prior to beginning work on the title, Wall spent weeks reviewing various pieces of in-game material provided by Treyarch's audio director, Brian Tuey; this included story treatments and documents covering Black Ops Cold War's level design and flow.

External audio
- "Cold War" - Call of Duty®: Black Ops Cold War Main Theme presents composer Jack Wall's theme for Black Ops Cold War, YouTube audio/visualization video from Treyarch's channel

For the game's main theme, titled "Cold War", Wall wanted to write something that "immediately" evoked the Cold War era; to do this, he employed use of a "Soviet-sounding" choir and orchestral instruments, and modular synthesizers from the 1980s, including Moog Modular, Minimoog, and CS-80, as well as other "soft" synths, in order to give the theme a "dark, shadowy Black Ops feel in the time of larger-than-life Cold War political figures like Reagan and Brezhnev." Wall considers "Cold War" to be the track that he is most proud of, and said that he feels it best captures the game's "signature". Wall also collaborated with musician Big Giant Circles on an "energetic" theme song for Black Ops Cold War's multiplayer component, titled "Rising Tide".

== Marketing ==
On August 7, 2020, Activision shipped locked crates to various influencers within the Call of Duty community, instructing them to open the crates on August 10. Two days later, cryptic messages began appearing to players in Call of Duty: Warzone, which included the text "know your history". On August 10, influencers uncovered a website called "PawnTakesPawn.com"; starting on August 14, fans were allowed to watch VHS tapes on the website, which contained news segments and footage that pertained to the corresponding year(s) throughout the Cold War. Throughout the VHS tapes, at random intervals, two-digit nixie tube combinations appeared, required to solve ciphers, in addition to one set of coordinates per VHS tape that led to a location in Warzone.

On August 19, once all ciphers were solved, a teaser trailer for the game was revealed. The teaser featured footage from an interview with KGB defector Yuri Bezmenov discussing active measures. Shortly after its release, the teaser was banned in China due to the inclusion of a brief snippet of the 1989 Tiananmen Square protests; an edited minute-long version was released worldwide instead. Kotaku's Ian Walker accused Activision of legitimating the views of Bezmenov when it included footage of his interview in the teaser for Black Ops Cold War. Among the complaints he had was that Bezmenov's views acted as a magnet for far-right conspiracy theories and personalities, that Activision presented Bezmenov's interview without the proper context and that Bezmenov himself held views that Walker argued were on the far-right. A full reveal for the game debuted on August 26, as part of an in-game event in Warzone.

On September 23, teasers for the Zombies mode began to appear on "PawnTakesPawn.com"; on the same day, various Call of Duty YouTubers, including NoahJ456 and MrDalekJD, were sent crates, which contained 1980s technology and ciphers to solve. A full reveal for the Zombies mode debuted on September 30.

== Release ==
Black Ops Cold War was released on November 13, 2020, for PlayStation 4, PlayStation 5, Windows, Xbox One, and Xbox Series X/S. Those who pre-ordered the game received early access to an open beta test for the game's multiplayer component. The beta was held across two weekends; the first weekend—exclusive to players on PlayStation 4—took place from October 8 to October 12, while the second weekend, which was available on PlayStation 4, Windows, and Xbox One, was held from October 15 to October 20. The Windows version of Black Ops Cold War was initially exclusive to the Battle.net platform, but was made available on Steam in March 2023. The game also became available on Xbox Game Pass on September 8th, 2026, across Ultimate, Premium, and PC tiers.

=== Post-release updates ===
Following the game's release, Treyarch supported Black Ops Cold War with free seasonal updates, which added new playable content to the multiplayer and Zombies modes, including new maps, weapons, characters, and game modes. Each "season" also featured a premium battle pass and a series of cosmetic items, the latter of which can be purchased by players through an in-game store. Six total seasons were released for the game; the first season was released on December 16, 2020, the second on February 25, 2021, the third on April 22, the fourth on June 17, the fifth on August 13, and the sixth and final season on October 7. Some seasonal updates also included crossover content with several media franchises and other Call of Duty titles in the form of new playable characters for the multiplayer and Zombies modes, including John Rambo from the Rambo franchise, John McClane from the Die Hard film series, Ghostface from the Scream franchise, Captain Price from Call of Duty's Modern Warfare sub-series, and Arthur Kingsley from Call of Duty: Vanguard (2021).

== Reception ==
=== Critical reception ===
Reception

Aggregate scores
Aggregator	Score
Metacritic	76/100
OpenCritic	61% recommend

Review scores
Publication	Score
Game Informer	8.75/10
GameSpot	7/10
GamesRadar+	SP: 3/5; MP: 3.5/5
Hardcore Gamer	4/5
IGN	SP: 7/10; MP: 6/10; Zombies: 7/10
PC Gamer (US)	69/100
PCGamesN	9/10
Video Games Chronicle	3/5

Black Ops Cold War received "generally favorable reviews", according to the review aggregator website Metacritic, which calculated a weighted average rating of 76/100 across all platforms, based on 42 reviews for the PlayStation 5 version, 31 reviews for the Windows version, and 21 reviews for the Xbox Series X/S version. OpenCritic determined that 61% of critics recommended the game.

The single-player campaign received a mostly positive response from critics. GameSpot's Kallie Plagge praised the campaign's open-ended level design, and highlighted a mission that gives players "free rein" to explore a KGB building, writing that it was "a showcase for both stealth and freedom of choice". IGN's Ryan McCaffrey enjoyed the inclusion of the safe house feature and praised the ability to customize the player character, but felt that the game's narrative was weaker than the one featured in Call of Duty: Black Ops (2010). Game Informer's Daniel Tack stated that the campaign was an "enjoyable-but-short return to form for Black Ops". PC Gamer's Morgan Park commented that the campaign's strongest features, such as the stealth-focused missions and the interactions with NPCs, were "under-explored or fleeting", and felt that the game's "perplexing" plot had ended abruptly.

Reviewers had mixed opinions on Black Ops Cold War's multiplayer component. IGN's Simon Cardy gave it a 6/10 score, writing that it was a step backwards from the multiplayer of Call of Duty: Modern Warfare (2019) in several aspects, including map design, visuals, and day-one content. Plagge felt that the multiplayer was "clumsier" than Modern Warfare, noting the omission of several gameplay features from Modern Warfare, including the ability to mount weapons and switch a weapon's fire rate. GamesRadar+'s Ford James stated that Black Ops Cold War's selection of maps was an improvement over Modern Warfare's maps, which he found to be "terrible". Kevin Dunsmore of Hardcore Gamer also offered praise towards the maps, writing that their core "three-lane" design kept "engagements high and wandering about minimal".

The Zombies mode was met with mostly positive reviews from critics. IGN's David Jagneaux gave the mode a 7/10 rating, praising the "layered" design of its launch map, "Die Maschine", and the ability to start a match with a customized weapon, but criticizing the lack of support for split-screen play and the exclusion of some features from the Zombies mode in Call of Duty: Black Ops 4 (2018). PCGamesN's Jordan Forward appreciated the inclusion of several features that he thought were helpful in making the mode more accessible to new players, such as the customizable pre-game loadouts and the addition of health bars for all enemies. Plagge praised Die Maschine's design and felt that the mode's learning curve was "manageable", but noted that the overall difficulty curve "rapidly" increased after the first ten rounds. Video Games Chronicle's Jordan Middler stated that Zombies "excels" when played with friends, and felt that the mode was a great inclusion for long-term fans.

=== Sales ===
According to the NPD Group, Black Ops Cold War was the best-selling game of 2020 in the United States. By February 2021, the title ranked as the twentieth best-selling video game in the U.S. by lifetime dollar sales. SuperData Research reported that the game sold 5.7 million digital units in November 2020. In the United Kingdom, Black Ops Cold War debuted atop of the digital charts for the week ending November 13th, with an almost 39% increase in sales when compared to Modern Warfare, but retail sales saw a decrease by 64%. In Japan, the PlayStation 4 version sold 84,475 physical copies within its first week on sale, making it the best-selling retail game of the week in the country, while the PlayStation 5 version was the nineteenth best-selling retail game throughout the same week, with 6,045 copies being sold. By December 2024, Black Ops Cold War sold 30 million copies.

== Sequel ==
A sequel to Black Ops Cold War, titled Call of Duty: Black Ops 6, was released on October 25, 2024.
