= Roswell, New Mexico (TV series) =

2019 American science fiction drama series

- Genre: Drama; Science fiction; Mystery
- Based on: Roswell High by Melinda Metz
- Developed by: Carina Adly Mackenzie
- Starring: Jeanine Mason; Nathan Dean; Michael Vlamis; Lily Cowles; Tyler Blackburn; Heather Hemmens; Michael Trevino; Trevor St. John; Karan Oberoi; Amber Midthunder
- Narrated by: Jeanine Mason
- Composers: Michael Suby; Dennis Smith
- Country of origin: United States
- Original language: English
- No. of seasons: 4
- No. of episodes: 52

Production
- Executive producers: Carina Adly MacKenzie; Kevin Kelly Brown; Justin Falvey; Darryl Frank; Lawrence Bender; Julie Plec
- Cinematography: Alan Caso; David Daniel; Rich Paisley
- Editors: Christopher Nelson; Tyler L. Cook; Rachel Katz-Overstreet; Karen Castañeda; Robert Ivison; Sunghwan Moon; Betsy C. Thompson
- Camera setup: Single-camera
- Running time: 40–43 minutes
- Production companies: Amblin Television; My So-Called Company; Bender Brown Productions; CBS Studios (Note: Credited as CBS Television Studios for seasons 1–2); Warner Bros. Television

Original release
- Network: The CW
- Release: January 15, 2019 – September 5, 2022

Related
- Roswell

Roswell, New Mexico is an American science fiction drama television series, named after the city of Roswell, New Mexico, the site of a famous alleged UFO incident. Developed by Carina Adly Mackenzie for the CW, it debuted as a midseason entry during the 2018–2019 television season on January 15, 2019. The show ended its four-season run on September 5, 2022.

Rosewell, New Mexico is the second television adaptation of the Roswell High book series by Melinda Metz, following the WB series Roswell (1999–2002).

== Overview ==
After returning to her hometown of Roswell, New Mexico, Liz, the daughter of undocumented immigrants, discovers her teenage crush is an alien who has kept his unearthly abilities hidden his entire life. She protects his secret as the two reconnect, but when a violent attack points to a greater alien presence on Earth, the politics of fear and hatred threaten to expose him.

== Cast and characters ==
=== Main ===
- Jeanine Mason as Liz Ortecho, a jaded biomedical researcher and the daughter of undocumented immigrants
- Nathan Dean as Max Evans, a natural born leader and dedicated Roswell deputy sheriff, who has kept his true identity a secret for years (Note: Dean is credited as Nathan Dean Parsons in season 1 and as Nathan Dean from season 2.)
- Michael Vlamis as Michael Guerin, a troubled but brilliant alien drifter, who survived a traumatic childhood and is trying to find a way to escape Earth
- Lily Cowles as Isobel Evans, an alien and Max's sister, who keeps her true identity a secret by living her life with grace and enthusiasm
- Tyler Blackburn as Alex Manes, an Air Force veteran with his fair share of physical and psychological trauma. Alex prepares to abandon his dreams and the possibility of a future with the man he loves, Michael Guerin, to fulfill his father's expectations.
- Heather Hemmens as Maria DeLuca, Liz and Rosa's best friend, who is a bartender at the popular saloon the Wild Pony, and was previously oblivious to the existence of aliens
- Michael Trevino as Kyle Valenti, a doctor and the son of the town sheriff, who learns about horrible things that have happened in his family's past
- Trevor St. John as Jesse Manes (seasons 1–2), Alex's homophobic and violent father, a senior master sergeant with a secret to hide
- Karan Oberoi as Noah Bracken (season 1; guest season 2), Isobel's charming, devoted lawyer husband, who senses a secret in his wife
- Amber Midthunder as Rosa Ortecho (seasons 2–4; recurring season 1), Liz's older sister, who was apparently killed in a car crash while driving high on drugs, killing two other girl passengers in the process. Liz gradually comes to realize that Max may have been involved in her death.

=== Recurring ===
- Carlos Compean as Arturo Ortecho, Liz's father, who runs the Crashdown Cafe diner. He is an undocumented immigrant from Mexico and has been hiding his undocumented status for nearly 30 years.
- Peter Diseth as Grant / Graham Green, an alien theorist and podcaster and his twin brother, a proprietor of an alien-themed museum
- Kayla Ewell as Nora Truman, Michael's biological mother who was present at the UFO crash in 1947
- Rosa Arredondo as Michelle Valenti (seasons 1–3), Kyle's mother, who succeeded her late husband, Jim Valenti, as sheriff of Roswell
- Dylan McTee as Wyatt Long (seasons 1–3), the brother of one of the girls Rosa Ortecho killed in a car accident, who harbors a grudge against her family
- Riley Voelkel as Jenna Cameron (seasons 1–2, 4), Max's fellow deputy and partner In the fourth season, she joins the FBI.
- Sherri Saum as Mimi DeLuca (seasons 1–2), Maria's mother, who suffers from an undiagnosed mental illness typified by some temporary memory loss and her belief in aliens
- Claudia Black as Ann Evans (seasons 1–2), Max and Isobel's adoptive mother
- Kiowa Gordon as Flint Manes (seasons 1–2), Alex Manes' older brother
- Justina Adorno as Steph (season 2), the daughter of the hospital's director of Surgery who catches Kyle's attention
- Jason Behr as Tripp Manes (season 2), Alex Manes' great-uncle who was present at the UFO crash in 1947
- Cassandra Jean Amell as Louise Truman (seasons 2–3; guest season 4), Isobel's biological mother who was present at the UFO crash in 1947
- Gaius Charles as Roy Bronson (seasons 2–3; guest season 4), a farmer from 1947 who befriends Nora and falls in love with Louise
- Jamie Clayton as Grace Powell / Charlie Cameron (season 2), Jenna Cameron's sister who is on the run from the military
- Cleo Anthony as Diego (season 2), Liz's ex-fiancé whom she left in Colorado prior to her return to Roswell
- Christian Antidormi as Forrest Long (seasons 2–3), Wyatt Long's cousin and a love interest of Alex Manes
- Tanner Novlan as Gregory Manes (seasons 2–3), Alex Manes' protective older brother
- La'Charles Trask as Bert (seasons 2–3)
- Steven Krueger as Heath (season 3, guest season 4), Liz's colleague at Genoryx
- Sibongile Mlambo as Anatsa (season 3–4), an investigative journalist
- David DeSantos as Edgar (season 3)
- Michael Grant Terry as Jordan Bernhardt (season 3), the son of Roswell's mayor
- Gillian Vigman as Brooke Taylor (season 3), the town sheriff
- Quentin Plair as Dallas (season 3–4)
- Andrew Lees as Clyde (season 4)
- Zoe Cipres as Bonnie (season 4)
- Rekha Sharma as Dr. Shivani Sen (season 4)

== Production ==
=== Development ===
In January 2018, the CW ordered the show to pilot, with Julie Plec set to direct. Production companies involved with the pilot included Amblin Television, Bender Brown Productions, CBS Television Studios and Warner Bros. Television. The CW ordered the show to series on May 11, 2018. On April 24, 2019, the CW renewed the series for a second season, which premiered on March 16, 2020. On January 7, 2020, the series was renewed for a third season. On February 3, 2021, ahead of its third season premiere, the CW renewed the series for a fourth season. The third season premiered on July 26, 2021. The fourth season premiered on June 6, 2022. On May 12, 2022, the CW announced that the fourth season would be the last.

=== Casting ===
On February 16, 2018, Jeanine Mason was cast in the lead role of Liz Ortecho. In early March, the rest of the cast was filled out, with Nathan Parsons as Max Evans, Lily Cowles as Isobel, Michael Vlamis as Michael Guerin, Tyler Blackburn as Alex Manes, Heather Hemmens as Maria DeLuca, and Michael Trevino as Kyle Valenti. Karan Oberoi was cast in the final series regular role of Noah Bracken on March 27, 2018. Trevor St. John was cast in a recurring role as Alex's father on March 12, 2018. In April 2019, Amber Midthunder, who played Liz's older sister Rosa in a recurring capacity in the first season, was promoted to the main cast for the second season. In May 2020, Tanner Novlan was cast in the recurring role of Alex's brother, Gregory, first appearing in the tenth episode of the second season. At the end of that year, it was confirmed that he would reprise the role in the third season.

=== Filming ===
Filming for the pilot took place in Albuquerque and Santa Fe, New Mexico. Production on the pilot begin on March 14, 2018, and ended on March 30, 2018. The rest of the first-season episodes began filming August 13, 2018, in Las Vegas, New Mexico; and Santa Fe, New Mexico. Filming on the third season began on October 15, 2020. Filming for the fourth and final season started in August 2021 and concluded in January 2022.

== Episodes ==
=== Series overview ===
Season	Episodes	Originally released	
Season	Episodes	First released	Last released
1	13	January 15, 2019	April 23, 2019
2	13	March 16, 2020	June 15, 2020
3	13	July 26, 2021	October 11, 2021
4	13	June 6, 2022	September 5, 2022

=== Season 1 (2019) ===
No. overall	No. in season	Title	Directed by	Written by	Original release date	U.S. viewers (millions)
1	1	"Pilot"	Julie Plec	Teleplay by : Carina Adly Mackenzie	January 15, 2019	1.51
After losing her research grant, biomedical scientist Liz Ortecho returns to her hometown of Roswell to work in her family's diner. There, she reconnects with her high-school crush, deputy sheriff Max Evans, her old friend Maria DeLuca and her former boyfriend Kyle Valenti. When a gunman shoots and fatally wounds Liz in the restaurant, Max is forced to use his healing abilities to save her, leaving him weakened until his sister Isobel nurses him back to health. She and his friend (and fellow alien) Michael confront Max over the wisdom of using his abilities to save Liz's life. Max becomes overburdened by guilt and decides to tell Liz who he truly is, unaware that Liz has secretly taken a DNA sample from him and analyzed it. He takes her to the site of the "birth" of his siblings and him, and reveals that his powers also create a temporary psychic link between Liz and him, allowing her to view his memories. Kyle, having uncovered Liz's analysis, is taken to "Project Shepherd", a government initiative to track extraterrestrials. At their high-school reunion, Isobel warns Max to break things off with Liz before she learns the truth behind her sister Rosa's death.
2	2	"So Much for the Afterglow"	Tim Andrew	Eva McKenna & Carina Adly MacKenzie	January 22, 2019	1.21
Liz receives a new grant in San Diego, allowing her to leave town. Despite learning that his ancestor was killed by an alien in 1947, Kyle refuses to assist Project Shepherd. Max and his partner Jenna identify a local, Wyatt Long, as the man who shot Liz, and embarrass him in a shooting contest. Isobel and Michael try to intimidate Liz, but Max defends her. Kyle agrees to help Liz find her sister's hidden autopsy report, which reveals that she did not die in an accident. At the same time, she learns from her psychic bond that Max was with Rosa on the night she died. Wyatt and his friends assault Liz's father; Max beats Wyatt and nearly kills him with his abilities before his siblings intervene. Conflicted by Max's actions saving her father, Liz asks him to tell her when he last saw Rosa, and he lies. Michael strikes up a relationship with Alex Manes, a veteran working near his trailer, while Max has sex with Jenna at her house. Liz decides to stay in Roswell, telling Kyle that she intends to bring her sister's murderer to justice, even if it is Max. Title reference: From the 1997 song and album of the same name of rock band Everclear, So Much for the Afterglow.
3	3	"Tearin' Up My Heart"	Geoff Shotz	Rick Montano & Vincent Ingrao	January 29, 2019	1.27
Under the guise of treating him, Liz tries to scientifically determine if Max killed Rosa. Isobel and Michael, fearing the consequences of Liz learning too much, concoct a plan to drive her away. Maria gives Liz a secret map written by Rosa that leads them to a clue suggesting that she had a secret relationship. Max asks Jenna out on a date. After Kyle sees an injury on Liz caused by Max's abilities, he secretly copies his father's research on aliens for Project Shepherd. Isobel telepathically probes Liz's mind, but is unable to compel her to leave after seeing images of Rosa. Liz confesses to Maria that she nearly married, but ultimately chose to leave her fiance. She then discovers a love letter from Max to her sister, but he reveals that the letter was actually meant for her. Sheriff Valenti warns her son not to trust Project Shepherd. Max swears that he did not kill Rosa, and begs Liz to leave the past behind. Kyle turns over the copies to Project Shepherd, but makes it clear he will provide no further assistance. Max suffers a nervous breakdown and unleashes the full extent of his powers, triggering a town-wide blackout. Title reference: From the 1997 song of boy band NSYNC, Tearin' Up My Heart.
4	4	"Where Have All the Cowboys Gone?"	Lance Anderson	Sabir Pirzada & Christopher Hollier	February 5, 2019	1.12
A flashback to 2008 shows Rosa warning Liz not to pursue a relationship with Kyle. In the present, Max and his siblings discuss how to handle Liz; Isobel offers to use her powers again and leaves with Michael to strengthen them. Arturo goes into cardiac arrest, and winds up hospitalized, during which Kyle offers Liz a bioengineering job. Max offers to make things up to Jenna. Isobel tests her powers, learning from Maria that she blames her for Rosa's death before seizing up. Rosa's old boyfriend Frederico gives Liz her old backpack, including a letter with distinctive handwriting. With the hospital's failing power putting its patients in danger, Max fixes the main power unit, leaving behind a scorch mark that Jenna notices. Liz confronts Kyle, accusing his father of having an affair with Rosa; Kyle, in turn, reveals his father knew about aliens. When Max asks Liz how does she feel about him, she reveals being terrified of him, so Max decides to end things between them for good. Jesse, Alex's father and a member of Project Shepherd, presses Jenna for access to Sheriff Valenti's files. Michael tells Max and Isobel that he will confess to Rosa's murder to protect them. Title reference: From the 1997 song of singer Paula Cole, Where Have All the Cowboys Gone?.
5	5	"Don't Speak"	Jeffrey Hunt	Adam Lash & Cori Uchida	February 12, 2019	1.14
Isobel disappears, so Max and Michael set out to find her. Liz finds a recording from the night her sister died with a local documentarian, Grant Green, saying that he saw "floating people", but when she confronts him, he runs off. Kyle and Alex uncover a vault belonging to the late Jim Valenti that he used to keep Rosa safe while he helped her detox from her addiction. Liz breaks into Green's storehouse and confronts him again; he shows her a tape of what he saw. Isobel is rescued, but accidentally admits that she used her powers on Liz years earlier to send her away after Rosa's death. Kyle discovers that, rather than take advantage of her, Jim was, in fact, Rosa's father, which explains why he went to such lengths to shield her. Max forces Isobel to track down Liz, who is captured and interrogated by Wyatt, who has been sent to silence Green. She escapes, and runs into Max, who shoots Wyatt. Noah kicks Isobel out after she refuses to explain why she left. Alex finds a piece of alien husk hidden by Jim. Liz realizes that Max covered up Rosa's death because Isobel killed her. Title reference: From the 1996 song of rock band No Doubt, Don't Speak.
6	6	"Smells Like Teen Spirit"	Tim Andrew	Eva McKenna & Carina Adly MacKenzie	February 26, 2019	0.89
In 2004, a young Max uses his power for the first time to save Isobel from a rapist. He explains to Liz that the trauma of that night caused Isobel's blackouts. In 2008, at their high-school prom, Liz leaves her date, Kyle, when Alex accuses him of using an anti-gay slur. Isobel grows closer to Rosa, who wants to leave town so she can get clean, and disappears that night, sparking an argument between her brothers and her. Liz and Max go on a trip into the desert, where Max confesses his dream to be a writer. Alex and Michael discover they are attracted to each other, and hook up. Jesse catches them, and breaks Michael's hand. A drunken Rosa drives Max off just before Isobel kidnaps and smothers her in a jealous rage after previously killing two girls who had vandalized Rosa's car before blacking out, which causes her to suffer amnesia. Michael lies and says that he killed the girls, and the siblings stage a car accident to destroy the bodies. A horrified Liz tells Max she never wants to see him again. Isobel tells Michael that she is ready to answer for what she did. Title reference: From the 1991 song of rock band Nirvana, Smells Like Teen Spirit.
7	7	"I Saw the Sign"	Paul Wesley	Miguel Nolla & Christopher Hollier	March 5, 2019	1.02
In 1947, Project Shepherd conducts an autopsy of a deceased alien, discovering a strange symbol on its hand, which matches one on Max's back. Max is reinstated as a deputy, but denied permission to return to active duty, and Liz agrees to help Maria with her mentally ill mother Mimi, who believes in the existence of aliens, which she frequently confuses with the plot of Independence Day. Jenna questions Wyatt, who professes ignorance of trying to kill Liz, and witnesses him unconsciously sketching Max's symbol. Mimi gives Alex a vague warning about not ending up like Jim Valenti and his father, and mistakes Liz for Rosa, which she plays along with to gain her trust. This allows her to learn that Isobel confessed to being an alien to Rosa. Max discovers that Liz has been conducting experiments using his DNA to develop a serum that neutralizes alien powers; Isobel, wracked with guilt, agrees to be placed on a temporary psych hold. Max asks Liz to continue working on the serum in the hopes that it might allow his siblings and him to lead normal lives. Jenna gives Max's name to Jesse for further investigation. Title reference: From the 1993 song of pop band Ace of Base, The Sign.
8	8	"Barely Breathing"	Ruba Nadda	Glenn Farrington & Kamran Pasha	March 12, 2019	0.92
Max visits his mother, Ann, for answers about his past. Kyle learns the truth about Rosa's death from Liz, and injects Isobel with the untested serum, which she claims was partly because she influenced him to do so. Alex knocks out his father and questions him about Project Shepherd. Isobel's health begins to deteriorate rapidly; Liz estimates she will be dead by the end of the day. Alex learns from Jesse's files that Michael is an alien. With no other options, Liz turns to alien research conducted by Michael in secret, which leads her to conclude that Isobel can only be saved by using the pods to keep her in suspended animation. Deducing that silver affects the pods, Liz concocts a substance to get Isobel into one of the pods, which she consents to after overhearing Max ranting about how he wishes he loved her less. Alex blackmails his father to shut down Project Shepherd and leave Roswell, accusing him of being blinded by his homophobia. On his way out of town, Jesse runs into Jenna, and tells her to keep an eye on Alex and any other alien phenomena in town. Michael begins to suspect that Max's symbol may be a "beacon" of some kind. Title reference: From the 1996 song of singer Duncan Sheik, Barely Breathing.
9	9	"Songs About Texas"	Shiri Appleby	Sabir Pirzada & Carina Adly MacKenzie	March 19, 2019	1.02
Six weeks after putting Isobel in stasis, Liz and Michael are no closer to a cure. Desperate, Max goes to Texas to meet Arizona, a faith healer he thinks may have alien abilities; Maria tags along hoping that Arizona can heal her mother, only to wind up shattered when Michael exposes Arizona as a fraud. Jenna asks Alex and Kyle about what she thinks is a police coverup concerning several mysterious deaths, and they reveal to her the existence of aliens. Alex subsequently restarts Project Shepherd to track a potential alien serial killer. Max confesses to Liz his guilt over not using his abilities to save more people. Later, he learns from Arizona's mother that a woman with healing powers died on her reservation around the time he arrived on Earth. Noah goes to find Max, and inadvertently discovers the pods. Kyle realizes that his father's death was covered up by Jesse. Alex decides that he wants to connect with Michael, even after realizing that he had sex with Maria. Liz tells Max that all signs point to a fourth alien in Roswell, who may possess knowledge of his home world. Title reference: From the 1997 song of singer Pat Green, Songs About Texas.
10	10	"I Don't Want to Miss a Thing"	Lance Anderson	Rick Montano & Vincent Ingrao	March 26, 2019	0.92
Max and Liz take Isobel out of her pod and inject her with the cure, seemingly taking away her blackouts. Michael shows Alex his plans to build a ship to leave Earth, leaving him emotionally conflicted. Noah is reluctant to take Isobel back, knowing that she is an alien, but eventually accepts her. Sheriff Valenti gives Kyle the rest of his father's letters. Isobel recovers some of her memories of Rosa, and decides to ask Liz for another dose. Maria confesses to having sex with Michael to Alex. A gunman attacks the hospital, and Noah is shot in the shoulder. Max rescues them and finds the shooter, who sets fire to Liz's laboratory; he claims that he does not remember the incident. Alex and Kyle use the piece of husk the former found to decode a secret message left by Jim Valenti, which references Caulfield, an old state prison. Isobel concludes from her memories that she loved Rosa and wanted to protect her, and gets more of the cure from Michael. Liz tells Max that she thinks the killer may have the ability to mentally control people when they black out. Isobel regains her memory of murdering Rosa while under the killer's influence. Title reference: From the 1998 song of rock band Aerosmith, I Don't Want to Miss a Thing.
11	11	"Champagne Supernova"	Edward Ornelas	Adam Lash & Cori Uchida	April 9, 2019	0.83
As the town prepares for the UFO Emporium reopening gala, Max asks Liz to be his date, but she declines, since she needs to accompany her father. Wyatt informs the police that he saw one of the murder victims with Maria. Liz's stem cell project is relocated to Palo Alto, but she is reluctant to leave her father again. Max and Michael are both abducted and locked in Michael's lab using a powder that neutralizes their powers, which makes them both irritable, until Max admits that he feels angry Michael was not adopted by his parents. In turn, Michael explains his cynical view of humanity and his fury over how Max expects him to act human even when it means hurting the people he loves. The killer drugs Maria, and uses her to steal a fake-cure syringe planted by Liz, who finds and rescues the brothers. Liz tells Max that if he truly loves her, he will not let her run away again. Arturo decides to apply for citizenship. Liz tests a sample of Noah's blood and realizes that he is an alien at the same time that he compels Isobel to kill Max. Jenna saves him, and Liz injects Noah with the serum before Max subdues him. Title reference: From the 1995 song of rock band Oasis, Champagne Supernova.
12	12	"Creep"	Dawn Wilkinson	Steve Stringer & Christopher Hollier	April 16, 2019	0.92
Liz, Max, and Isobel hold Noah while Max and Isobel question him. Alex, Kyle, and Michael travel to an abandoned prison, Caulfield, to the north. They find aliens imprisoned and tortured for 71 years in the care of Alex's brother. When Michael sets off an alarm while trying to free the prisoners, a timer is initiated and the prison is destroyed, killing all the alien prisoners including Michael's mother. He returns to Roswell and squares off against Max about letting Noah die. Title reference: From the 1992 song of rock band Radiohead, Creep.
13	13	"Recovering the Satellites"	Julie Plec; Tim Andrew	Story by : Carina Adly Mackenzie; Teleplay by : Eva McKenna & Carina Adly Mackenzie	April 23, 2019	1.03
Max wakes up and heals an unconscious and injured Michael. Isobel shows up and Max leaves with her on Noah's tail. Liz is in the diner and Noah shows up. Liz temporarily captures him but he escapes and injures her. Isobel directs Max to Noah but she was under Noah's control the entire time. Noah subdues Max. He takes them to the cave where their pods reside and prepares to place them in the pods as leverage for when the aliens come to take them back. Michael shows up and distracts Noah while Max gets an energy charge from the storm. Max attacks Noah and kills him. The next day Max and Liz hook up, Michael and Isobel find Noah's cave and find Rosa in his pod. They call Max and convince him not to tell Liz. Liz practices her powers, whereas Michael goes to Maria and sings for her indirectly expressing his emotions. In the cave, Max uses his powers to resurrect Rosa. Liz feels he's in trouble and shows up there just to find Rosa alive and an apparently dead Max. Title reference: From the 1996 studio album of rock band Counting Crows, Recovering the Satellites.

=== Season 2 (2020) ===
No. overall	No. in season	Title	Directed by	Written by	Original release date	U.S. viewers (millions)
14	1	"Stay (I Missed You)"	Lance Anderson	Carina Adly Mackenzie	March 16, 2020	0.75
Two weeks later, Max's body is being kept in a pod with his death kept quiet, Rosa is hiding out at his place prior to Liz taking her out of town for a fresh start, and Noah's death has been passed off as a lightning strike. Michael sabotages his relationships with both Alex and Maria. Liz realises Max still has a psychic connection to Rosa: Despite his heart being destroyed, his brain might still be alive. Flint tries to steal Noah's body but is stopped by Liz and Rosa. Liz, Kyle and Michael harvest Noah's heart, which Liz is convinced she can repair and use to revive Max. Isobel realises she is pregnant. Rosa sees Max in a dream, telling her not to let Liz bring him back. Title reference: From the 1994 song of the same name by Lisa Loeb.
15	2	"Ladies and Gentlemen We Are Floating in Space"	Lance Anderson	Eva McKenna	March 23, 2020	0.82
Alex helps Liz and Michael set up a lab in an abandoned government facility. Michael gets into a fight with Wyatt Long when he tears down one of the Missing posters for Mimi. Rosa learns how people in the town really feel about her and is furious with Liz for continuing to protect Max. Kyle and Alex use the video of Manes killing Valenti to blackmail him. Kyle meets Steph, the Dean of Surgery's daughter. Maria organises a female empowerment session that Isobel and her mother attend. Isobel takes some of the alien death serum to try to cause a miscarriage. Michael sets up camp in Maria's parking lot and they kiss. Rosa starts drinking to block out the visions of Max. Title reference: The 1997 album of the same name by Spiritualized which in-turn was taken from a line to the song "Ladies and Gentlemen We Are Floating in Space (I Can't Help Falling in Love)".
16	3	"Good Mother"	Jeffrey Hunt	Deirdre Mangan & Carina Adly Mackenzie	March 30, 2020	0.63
In 1947, Manes and Valenti's fathers encounter the survivors of the crash. In the present, Jenna returns to town and finds Mimi in the middle of nowhere, with no memory of the last month. Jenna visits Liz at the lab and finds out what's going on with Max. Isobel sees visions of Max as she continues taking serum to force an abortion. When she miscarries but is too weak to give herself the antidote, Max contacts Rosa who sends Liz to save her. Maria encounters Rosa at the Wild Pony and discovers the truth, leaving her furious with Liz and Michael. Michelle asks Isobel about Noah being restrained before he died but Isobel passes it off as sex games. Michael and Alex view the files of the crash aftermath and discover the aliens' mothers escaped with the pods containing them. In 1947, the two women are helped by a black homesteader. Title reference: The 1994 song of the same name by Jann Arden.
17	4	"What If God Was One of Us?"	Shiri Appleby	Steve Stringer & Christopher Hollier	April 6, 2020	0.63
1947: Bronson, the foreman of the Long ranch, agrees to shelter the two mothers. In the present day, Michael and Alex learn that soldiers led by Alex's great-uncle came there a year later, killed the humans who had helped them and abducted the pair. Liz asks Kyle to help her steal a genome machine from the hospital. In the process, she kisses him to get Steph suspicious, which leaves him uncomfortable. Jenna confronts Manes about Charlotte's whereabouts and he explains she had herself sent to jail because she had been involved in research that could be used to create a bioweapon. Isobel mind-warps Arturo to accept Rosa's return. Title reference: The 1996 song "One of Us" by Joan Osborne.
18	5	"I'll Stand By You"	Kimberly McCullough	Alanna Bennett & Jason Gavin	April 13, 2020	0.67
Liz, Michael and Isobel discover Max's pod has shorted out. Rosa realises he did it himself, telling them about her dreams. Liz decides she and Kyle will transplant the faulty heart into Max so he can at least live long enough to say goodbye. Isobel uses Rosa to enter a dream state with Max; he believes he absorbed dark energy when he revived Rosa and will want to hurt everyone. Alex and Maria clear the air and he also convinces her to forgive Liz. Michael comes up with an alien pacemaker to keep Max alive and, when it seems he will still die, Rosa demonstrates alien-like abilities to charge the defibrillator and revive him. After three weeks in a coma, Max awakes and he and Isobel face off. Title reference: The 1994 song of the same name by the Pretenders.
19	6	"Sex and Candy"	Geoff Shotz	Rick Montano & Vincent Ingrao	April 20, 2020	0.68
Isobel takes down Max, who is then revived by Michael, but he has no memory of Liz. They go on a first date together horse riding and Liz begins to suspect he is happier without his memories of her. However, they come flooding back after he finds the bullet she was shot with and the couple spend the night together on the roof of the Crashdown before she tells him she loves him. Maria takes Alex to visit Travis, the man who made the boots Mimi had when she was found, but he attacks them with an axe. Michael also arrives and they are saved by Travis' twin brother Trevor, who says Travis was part of a military experiment. Michael, Maria and Alex share a threesome. Isobel meets Kyle at a gay bar and tries to seduce him but ends up hooking up with the bargirl, Blaire, instead. Kyle finds Steph being operated on at the hospital. Title reference: The 1997 song of the same name by Marcy Playground.
20	7	"Como La Flor"	Barbara Brown	Danny Tolli & Carolina Rivera	April 27, 2020	0.76
Isobel tries to train Rosa to use her powers. Liz and Rosa's mother Helena arrives; Arturo wants her to sign her half of the diner over to Liz in order for her to sponsor his citizenship but she insists on a family meal with Liz, Arturo and Max first. She seems to want to make amends but turns out to be stealing. Arturo gives her his mother's ring in exchange for the contract and Max later retrieves it by threatening to reveal her past to her politician boyfriend. Rosa accidentally torches Helena's car after stealing some pills from it. Michael and Kyle look into Maria when she starts receiving visions and discover her grandmother was part of an experiment to try to give people alien powers. Maria uses her vision to save Kyle from being run over. Kyle and Steph kiss. Max realises Jenna is missing and decides to look for her. Title reference: The 1992 song of the same name by Selena.
21	8	"Say It Ain't So"	Rachel Raimist	Eva McKenna & Christopher Hollier	May 4, 2020	0.64
Liz and Isobel try to help Rosa pose as a distant cousin and she befriends a girl, Iris. Max and Liz meet with Charlie, who has come to town looking for Jenna. Max quizzes Manes, who points them towards a black ops group, Deep Sky. Max and Charlie rescue Jenna from a sealed container after which Charlie disappears again. Alex goes paintballing with Forrest but is still uncomfortable about publicly dating him. Michael realises Maria's necklace contains alien pollen that stops her using her powers, preventing her brain degradation. Liz finds Rosa collapsed from an overdose, having imagined Iris. She gives her Maria's necklace and checks her into rehab. Maria and Isobel share a vision of Isobel's mother with Walt, and Michael realises he is Sanders. Max finds Charlie shortly before they come under attack. Title reference: The 1994 song of the same name by Weezer.
22	9	"The Diner"	Aisha Tyler	Story by : Steve Stringer & Carina Adly Mackenzie; Teleplay by : Steve Stringer, Alanna Bennett & Carina Adly Mackenzie	May 11, 2020	0.68
Kyle takes Steph on a date to the diner but she leaves after he admits he knows she's dying. Liz tells him she's hoping to use the aliens' DNA to find a universal vaccine. Michelle arrests Max over the disappearances of Mimi, Jenna and Charlie. Isobel is unable to mind-warp her because Kyle laced her perfume with the yellow pollen, so Kyle helps Max convince her he was having a heart transplant at the time. Sanders gives Michael and Isobel his account of the farm raid but Alex becomes convinced Tripp was actually helping the aliens. He, Liz and Isobel find a photo left for Tripp at the diner showing Isobel's mother Louise as an older woman. Title reference: The 1994 song of the same name by Ani DiFranco.
23	10	"American Woman"	Marcus Stokes	Rick Montano & Vincent Ingrao and Jason Gavin	May 18, 2020	0.65
In 1948, Tripp takes the injured Louise to a friend, Harrison, on a native reservation. In the present, Alex takes Max, Michael, Isobel and Maria to the reservation, where his mother came from and his brother Gregory lives. He shows them Louise's grave, where Michael finds one of the alien flowers for Maria. Max and Isobel are able to enter the dreams of the aged and dying Harrison and learn Louise had a daughter and Max wasn't her child. The group deduce the baby was Maria's grandmother. Arturo is arrested by immigration police on a trip to the hospital. Liz and Jenna learn Liz was refused as sponsor because of her vandalism charge, and Liz has Diego arrange for his senator mother to have Arturo released. Diego discovers evidence Jenna was given a military memory erasure drug. Alex forces Michael to give him the piece of alien technology he found but is then attacked and abducted. Max has a flashback of Louise fighting someone to rescue him. Title reference: The 1970 song of the same name by the Guess Who that was covered by Lenny Kravitz in 1998.
24	11	"Linger"	Franklin Vallette	Ariana Quiñónez & Deirdre Mangan	June 1, 2020	0.54
Liz has a dream of Diego proposing to her. He spends the day helping her out at Crashdown and tries to get her to accept funding from his company, Genoryx. Kyle is suspended from work suspected of stealing hospital resources and helps Max investigate Jenna's disappearance. Steph manages to get him reinstated. Michael discovers Alex is missing and that Manes originally took him before he was taken again by Flint. Isobel visits Rosa in rehab and they discover Helena has also disappeared. Liz and Rosa realise Helena and Flint are working together. Flint takes Michael to Helena, who wants him to build a bomb. Title reference: The 1993 song of the same name by the Cranberries.
25	12	"Crash Into Me"	Joanna Kerns	Danny Tolli & Carolina Rivera	June 8, 2020	0.66
Liz, Maria and Isobel deduce that Mimi was with Helena when she disappeared. Helena forces Michael and Charlie to construct an atomiser which will release a toxin that targets aliens. Michael realises Helena is swapping it for one that will kill Manes and his family, in revenge for Jim's murder, so leaves Alex behind as a prisoner. Max and Jenna check out a storage facility Kyle found together and Max admits he is using the antidote to restore his memories of his old life. Flint gets the real atomiser from Charlie and leaves her chained up in a burning building. Liz realises Manes intends to cause a disaster and blame aliens so he will look like a hero for killing them: Graham Green has an alien artefact, supposedly given to him by Max, that will explode if ignited by the CrashCon fireworks display. Flint releases the anti-alien atomiser at the event; Maria gets it to safety but is infected in the process. Alex, Gregory and Michael all confront Manes together, while Max uses his powers to try to kill Flint before collapsing. Rosa wants Liz to help defuse the bomb but she tries to revive Max instead. Title reference: The 1996 song of the same name by Dave Matthews Band.
26	13	"Mr. Jones"	Jeffrey Hunt	Christopher Hollier & Carina Adly Mackenzie	June 15, 2020	0.65
Liz and Isobel manage to stop the bomb exploding while Rosa revives Max. Jenna gets Maria to the hospital (where she is saved by Liz's serum), Charlie is rescued by Helena and Gregory kills Manes when he tries to shoot Michael. Diego introduces Liz to Doctor Margot Meyerson who offers her a job in California. Max destroys Liz's laboratory to stop Diego from seeing it. Liz visits Steph and, soon after, Kyle finds she has miraculously recovered. Michael and Alex find Tripp's body buried under the Manes shed and that he left Mimi a journal, which reveals a stowaway, Mr. Jones, caused the ship to crash and attacked the soldiers, prompting the massacre. Alex kisses Forrest after singing at open mike night. Max, Isobel and Michael find a pod containing Mr. Jones, who resembles Max. Title reference: The 1993 song of the same name by Counting Crows.

=== Season 3 (2021) ===
No. overall	No. in season	Title	Directed by	Written by	Original release date	U.S. viewers (millions)
27	1	"Hands"	Lance Anderson	Carina Adly Mackenzie	July 26, 2021	0.61
Max, Michael and Isobel imprison Jones back in the pod. One year later, Liz is working for Margot in Los Angeles. When she leaks a medical patent the company was planning to sell for skin care applications, her colleague Heath helps cover it up and they kiss. Forrest warns Alex that Deep Sky are planning to recruit him. Wyatt recognises Rosa and tries to kill her; she injects him with Helena's memory erasure drug. Maria has a vision of a funeral. Kyle realises Max's body is rejecting his heart and Max tells Michael and Isobel. Maria is attacked by masked men and has another vision of the funeral where Alex says they're covering up a murder. Michael and Isobel release and cage Jones in the hope he can save Max.
28	2	"Give Me One Reason"	Lance Anderson	Eva McKenna & Deirdre Mangan	August 2, 2021	0.64
Jones tells Michael and Isobel that Nora and Laura were fleeing the Dictator that ruled their world. He went after them to free Max, who they had created using his DNA. Wyatt has lost ten years of memory from the injection. Alex gets a secret message that leads him to a remote spot. He and an officer, Eduardo Ramos, are trapped in a room with a dwindling air supply. Alex passes the test by realising Ramos is an impostor and is assigned to study a mysterious machine. Maria jumps off a roof to try to trigger a vision and Michael saves her. Michael realises he is the Dictator's son. Maria and Isobel get Kyle to try to trigger a vision with an adrenaline injection. Max discovers Anasta is a reporter, investigating the new sheriff who has replaced Michelle. Heath inspires Liz to go to Roswell for more DNA where she runs into Max.
29	3	"Black Hole Sun"	Aprill Winney	Eva McKenna & Onalee Hunter-Hughes	August 9, 2021	0.65
Max, Maria and Isobel attempt to work out who was dead in Maria's vision and suspect it was Michael. Liz retrieves some remnants of Noah's brain matter from her burnt-out lab and learns Max is dying but he refuses to involve her. Max, Maria and Gregory witness a group of rednecks led by mayor's son Jordan Bernhardt harassing black stallholder Bert and suspect the new sheriff is turning a blind eye. Michael finds some mysterious stones mutated by the 1947 crash and gives one to Alex. Another one triggers Isobel's empathic powers. Michael tells Max and Isobel about being the dictator's son. Alex sees the machine switch on at the same time that Kyle hears his father's voice on an old radio. Max visits Jones, causing his cage to short out and Jones to escape.
30	4	"Walk on the Ocean"	Aprill Winney	Onalee Hunter-Hughes & Christopher Hollier	August 16, 2021	0.64
Liz worries that Genoryx will steal her research and, against Heath's protests, decides to resign. Jones explores Max's life before showing him how Louise and Bronson imprisoned him in the pod because he was trying to take Max. He offers to heal his heart. Michael and Kyle find the radio contains a coded message from Kyle's father warning him to give up. Kyle learns Jordan has beaten up a Mexican farmer. Jordan tells Wyatt about his family's history with Rosa, prompting him to decide to go away for a while. Maria and Isobel take hallucinogenics to see the funeral vision and learn it is Kyle. Kyle is attacked by Jordan, who leaves him impaled. Max finds him and apparently tries to heal him. At the same moment, Liz collapses.
31	5	"Killing Me Softly with His Song"	Rachel Raimist	Alanna Bennett & Danny Tolli	August 23, 2021	0.63
The body of Jordan's friend Zeke is found at the Lopez farm, resulting in the Lopezes being arrested. The townsfolk protest it, prompting Sheriff Taylor to enlist Jordan and his friends as a militia. Liz gets Heath to drive her back to Roswell, having worked out she is suffering Max's heart failure. Max is draining Liz and Kyle in order to survive and the only answer is to have Jones heal him. Isobel realises Jones killed Zeke to be strong enough to heal Max, but they let him go ahead before returning him to the pod. Maria, Rosa and Anasta expose that Jordan dumped Zeke's body at the farm to frame the Lopezes and now plans to burn the farm down. Jordan is arrested and Zeke's death is ruled an accident. Liz decides to stay in Roswell with Heath leaving, upset she didn't trust him. Max finds Maria unconscious in his home with Kyle apparently missing.
32	6	"Bittersweet Symphony"	Rachel Raimist	Teleplay by : Steve Stringer & Leah Longoria and Eva McKenna; Story by : Steve Stringer & Leah Longoria	August 30, 2021	0.64
Max, Liz and Michael look into Kyle's disappearance. Max finds the intruders took Jones' sword. Michael slowly works out that Kyle activated the radio, which fried the local electric towers and connected with the radio that Deep Sky have. Alex works out that Ramos was involved in the attack on Kyle and DNA analysis shows he is Kyle's uncle. Ramos holds him at gunpoint. Maria is in a coma and Isobel is unable to get anything from her mindscape. Rosa gives Maria her power blocker and starts getting enhanced hearing, prompting Isobel to take her into the mindscape with her. Liz, Isobel and Rosa realise Jones has swapped places with Max and is responsible for Maria's coma. Jones kills the agents who were at the house and recovers his sword.
33	7	"Goodnight Elizabeth"	Heather Hemmens	Teleplay by : Kristen Haynes & Christopher Hollier and Eva McKenna; Story by : Kristen Haynes & Christopher Hollier	September 6, 2021	0.58
Jones tries to enter Maria's mind to access a certain memory but needs the sword recharged to overpower her. Liz, Isabel and Michael work out Jones is possessing Max and plan to microdose him with the power inhibitor. Isabel has Deputy Pete track him to stop him killing anyone. Rosa goes to covering priest Dallas for advice. Ramos takes Alex to where Kyle is lying comatose; Ramos found him injected with a drug by the intruders. He reveals that the machine was built by aliens at Caulfield and smuggled out by Jim, and Trevor Gunther went mad studying it. Rosa uses her ability to hear vibrations to help Michael and Isabel track down the sword. Jones evades the microdosing and retrieves the sword, revealing he is the Dictator and thus Michael's father. Rosa manages to drive him off from killing Michael and Isabel, but he later kills Pete and enters Maria's mind, taking her to March 11th 1969, the day the machine first activated.
34	8	"Free Your Mind"	Ben Hernandez Bray	Ashley Charbonnet & Joel Anderson Thompson	September 13, 2021	0.53
Liz and Alex get Maria released into their care. Jones wants Maria to relive what her grandmother Patricia did on the day she received a piece of alien glass. Isobel and Rosa enter Maria's mind to accompany her and they learn Patricia was sabotaging the experiments at Caulfield and working with Nora on the machine. Michael and Alex manage to retrieve the pod containing Max's mind in Jones' body. Isobel and Maria learn the Dictator has been surviving by transferring his mind to cloned bodies and the information on the glass will let him break the link with Max. It turns out Doctor Lockhart discovered what Patricia was doing, activating the machine and injecting her with an excess of drugs. Isobel keeps Jones busy until Liz and Rosa use sound waves to break the connection between him and Maria, who wakes up.
35	9	"Tones of Home"	America Young	Alanna Bennett & Leah Longoria & Steve Stringer	September 20, 2021	0.47
Max is conscious in Jones' dying body. Liz is trying to find a way to switch them back and sever their connection and wants to go to Heath for help. Isobel enlists Maria and Gregory to find the alien Nora was trying to contact and they discover evidence another boy emerged from a pod the same time as them. Kyle recovers at Deep Sky and Eduardo explains Jim was killed for smuggling the machine out. Michael and Eduardo realise Alex stole the machine to work on it in secret. Michael stops him jumping to his death during a hallucination and they work on the machine together. Evidence suggests Heath was involved in the attack on Kyle. Isobel checks out a church with Anasta. She, Liz and Max piece together that Dallas is the other alien and Heath is using Liz's research to try to cure him of a brain disease. Jones finds Heath first.
36	10	"Angels of the Silences"	Lauren Petzke	Danny Tolli & Onalee Hunter-Hughes	September 27, 2021	0.46
Liz and Max work out Heath is now working with Jones in the hope of getting a cure for Dallas. Isobel and Michael approach Dallas and tell him he's an alien, which he initially struggles with. They, Kyle and Alex convince him to view the message from the machine, which is his father encouraging the three aliens to work together. Liz finds Heath and convinces him they can work together but they are both captured by Jones, who also takes Sheriff Taylor as a hostage. Dallas tells Kyle that his father told him to kill Max if they can't separate him from Jones.
37	11	"2 Became 1"	Lauren Petzke	Eva McKenna	October 4, 2021	0.47
Heath manages to send Dallas a message letting him know where the hostages are being held. Jones explains to Liz how Nora made both him and Max impossible to be cloned by tethering them and promises to leave the planet if she saves them both. Liz agrees if he heals and releases Sheriff Taylor, but he instead possesses her and gets her to bring Dallas to him. Rosa helps Isobel locate her family's sword. She runs into Wyatt again and admits she is thinking of applying to art school. Max, Michael and Isobel carry out a raid on Jones' mansion, where Michael manages to free Sheriff Taylor and she and Heath are sent to safety. A stand-off ends with Jones trapping Liz, Max, Michael, Isobel and Dallas inside his mind.
38	12	"I Ain't Goin' Out Like That"	Lance Anderson	Isabel Nelson & Danny Tolli	October 11, 2021	0.44
Michael is able to resist the mindscape enough for Isobel to grab her sword and attack Jones but this leads to Dallas being injured. Jones leaves with Michael, while the others head to Deep Sky where Kyle and Isobel operate on Dallas, Max and Alex work on the machine and Liz and Heath try to find a way to untether Max and Jones without Max losing his powers. Michael resists Jones initially but Jones ends up stabbing him with the sword and finding out where the machine is. Maria has visions of first three coffins and then Michael lying injured, going to help him. Liz manages to complete a serum but then Jones arrives and dangles Kyle, Heath and Eduardo off the side of the mountain. Liz injects him with the serum and he drops them anyway.
39	13	"Never Let You Go"	Lance Anderson	Christopher Hollier	October 11, 2021	0.38
Max, Michael and Isobel use their powers to stop the three from falling. Liz works to construct some ligrands that will stop Jones and Max re-entangling, but once administered, they will only have seconds to kill Jones. Michael and Alex work out a way to use a radio tower and the Valenti radio to switch Max and Jones back, while Maria and Rosa help Isobel repair her shattered sword with Maria sacrificing her bracelet. Max and Jones are successfully switched but Jones manages to break free and they switch back and forth until it is unclear who is in which body. Liz works out which one is Jones and shoots him with the ligands, after which Max stabs him. As everyone rebuilds their lives, in Mexico, an apparently alien young woman is asking about Liz.

=== Season 4 (2022) ===
No. overall	No. in season	Title	Directed by	Written by	Original release date	U.S. viewers (millions)
40	1	"Steal My Sunshine"	Lance Anderson	Christopher Hollier	June 6, 2022	0.43
Six months later, Liz and Max are living together, Michael is moving in with Alex and giving Dallas his trailer, and Isobel and Anatsa admit they love each other. Liz and Kyle have made a serum that stops Maria's brain degenerating. Max, now interim sheriff, is planning to propose to Liz but she stops him, feeling something is about to happen. Liz is working as a teacher and worried about a student, Vanessa. Eduardo warns that weather conditions match those after the 1947 crash. Jenna, now with the FBI, requests Max's help with bank robberies committed by a pair of aliens, who are in a triad with Tesca, the alien from Mexico. They perform a ritual that causes the sky to turn purple and a ball of flame to strike near Max and Liz, connecting to something they call "the alighting".
41	2	"Fly"	Lauren Petzke	Sarah Tarkoff & Danny Tolli	June 13, 2022	0.47
Liz and Max try to convince people the light show was simply St Elmo's Fire but Graham Green is stoking up interest. Liz is visited by Shivani Sen, the wife of her mentor Allie Bentley, who shows her a locust mutated by the effect. Liz and Michael work out it is attracted to alien technology. Liz gets Vanessa a job at the Crashdown to help pay her way through university. Dallas helps Max and Jenna investigate the robbery and they learn that the robbers, now calling themselves Bonnie and Clyde, stole a lamp base and appear to be after Green's artifact. Max briefly encounters Clyde who confirms they came in response to Jones' signal. Anatsa is investigating the robbery. Worried for her safety, Isobel mind warps her into dropping it. Alex is ambushed by Tesca.
42	3	"Subterranean Homesick Alien"	America Young	Joel Anderson Thompson & Leah Longoria	June 20, 2022	0.46
Jenna finds out the missing safety deposit box belonged to Maria's grandmother. Dallas learns from Graham that there's a second box. Maria admits to him that she's lost her visions but they manage to find the key to the second box. Liz traces the oil field where the aliens hid and finds Shivani there. Shivani says she and Allie are trying to use alien healing to help their daughter. Michael meets Bonnie and feels he can make a connection with her. As part of this, he frees her and Clyde after Max, Liz and Jenna shut them in the bank vault. Isobel and Anatsa meet Kyle and his date Kira, who turns out to be working the insurance on the bank robbery. Isobel trying to stop Anatsa investigating drives them apart. Eduardo is confronted by Tesca. Kyle finds Jones' body is missing.
43	4	"Dear Mama"	Ben Hernandez Bray	Ashley Charbonnet & Onalee Hunter-Hughes	June 27, 2022	0.45
Maria and Dallas find a dying Mimi, who makes cryptic references to Maria needing to go somewhere. Tesca, Bonnie and Clyde conduct a ritual apparently intended to revive Jones. Michael befriends Bonnie and Clyde and tells them he's Jones' son. They show him a device built by his mum which can return them home and which needs the crystal they tried to take from the bank to complete. Michael finds Eduardo tied up and frees him. Isobel tries to tell Anatsa the truth before she leaves town but finds it's too late. Liz discovers Tesca's cells can regenerate after appearing to die. Kyle investigates a clue in Carayes, Mexico and finds a woman who resembles Tesca inside a pod. Jenna encounters a fake Eduardo. Max believes he has found Jenna but she turns out to be Tesca, a shapeshifter.
44	5	"You Get What You Give"	Christine Swanson	Kristen Haynes & Christopher Hollier	July 11, 2022	0.44
Tesca uses a link with Max to gain a blue flame power, which she uses to burn Jones' body. Max later tricks her into helping him control the power, but when he tries to use it against her, he accidentally injures Liz. Isobel joins Kyle in Carayes and they revive the woman, who turns out to be Eduardo's daughter Sonia. The Valentis have been hiding alien artefacts there since 1947 and Tesca took one when she imprisoned Sonia. Isobel and Kyle kiss. Michael goes looking for Eduardo and manages to convince Bonnie to find out what Clyde and Tesca are planning, which seems to involve taking Max back to Oasis. Michael gives Clyde the last crystal to complete the device. Dallas tells Maria he has memories of being on Earth with his father. They learn he planted an alien tree at an abandoned church, which Mimi sketched. Maria tells Liz about losing her visions. Michael collapses in front of Dallas.
45	6	"Kiss From a Rose"	Michael Grossman	Sarah Tarkoff & Steve Stringer	July 18, 2022	0.43
Tesca orders Bonnie to kill Michael and she instead gets herself arrested to seek help from Max. Michael has lost his powers as a result of an alien virus and Liz realises Bonnie deliberately infected him: Her ability is permanently robbing people of powers. Tesca attacks and Liz uses Bonnie's virus to revert her to her real form. Isobel tries to shrug off sleeping with Kyle but he tells her he loves her. Eduardo turns up and Kyle tries to reconcile him and Sonia. Isobel returns to Roswell to help Maria and Dallas look into a clue Theo left about the tree. Shivani takes possession of alien regenerative cells. Maria feels Mimi is trying to contact her somehow. Worried that his new powers will lead to him accidentally hurting Liz, Max has Bonnie take them away.
46	7	"Dig Me Out"	Eric Sherman	Isabel Nelson & Joel Anderson Thompson	July 25, 2022	0.50
Liz is angry with Max's decision and heads to New York to see Rosa. Michael and Bonnie try to convince Clyde to complete his quest without Tesca. Isobel and Dallas look through her memories and see that Theo was working on something Jones wanted and Dallas was placed back in the pod after Tesca went after him. Dallas retrieves the glasses needed to decode Theo's work from the riverbed. Max, Michael and Bonnie work out Nora was working on a spaceship hidden on Bronson's land. Max, Michael and Isobel go there and encounter Tesca, who they manage to defeat. Isobel remembers Tesca was her teacher on Oasis. Clyde has been manipulating everyone and manages to get hold of Theo's work while causing Dallas and Bonnie to be sucked into the sand. Liz and Maria work out it is actually Alex trying to contact her. Dallas wakes up with Theo.
47	8	"Missing My Baby"	Antonio Negret	Ariana Quiñónez & Danny Tolli	August 1, 2022	0.44
Clyde is hunting down the remaining items needed for the alighting and encounters Vanessa while looking for Liz. Rosa returns to help Maria search for Alex. Michael is initially kept in the dark about Alex being missing and is angry with Max when he finds out. Liz discovers Shivani has been using material from a damaged pod and is able to use an intact one to come up with a way of giving Michael his powers back. Max, Michael, Maria and Rosa follow the clues to the spot where Alex and the others disappeared, which seems to be a conduit to another world. Isobel and Tesca review their memories and learn Tesca was a rebel and friend who was captured by Jones and corrupted. Liz discovers Shivani has used the cure to increase her brain power and hopes to use it to revive her daughter Nicole, whose body is kept in suspended animation. Shivani exposes them both to a large dose of the cure.
48	9	"Wild Wild West"	Michael Trevino	Leah Longoria & Onalee Hunter Hughes	August 8, 2022	0.40
Max, Isobel, Michael, Maria and Rosa work to treat Liz. Max has Isobel put him in her mind but this leads to a wild west simulation where he is kidnapped, becoming trapped in there. Rosa calls Heath for help and he and Michael work out a way to use the power blocking enzymes to give Liz time. Liz wakes up in the same scenario as town sheriff and discovers Max is being held by the part of her that wanted to take the drug. She tries gathering together representatives of her friends to rescue him but they are all killed. She admits the real problem is her fear of failing and seeing those she loves killed. The two Lizes face off, there is a gunshot and Liz and Max wake up. Liz claims not to remember what happened: In fact, she fired into the air, seemingly surrendering control to her darker side.
49	10	"Down in a Hole"	Aprill Winney	Ashley Charbonnet & Sarah Tarkoff	August 15, 2022	0.49
Bonnie and Dallas are trapped in a pocket dimension created by Theo. Kyle returns with a box left behind by Nora, which contains parts of Michael's console. Bonnie and Dallas find a similar box. Tesca recalls Theo was working on a way to travel between worlds and had found a way to stop Jones using it, which he needed Liz to bypass. Max and Rosa work out Liz is still using the mist but are unable to convince her to stop. Max goes to Isobel for help getting his powers back, while Liz concludes Shivani's plan to resurrect Nicole is doomed to fail and strikes out on her own. Maria leads Michael and Kyle to the console's intended site. They open the portal to the pocket dimension but, low on power, Michael joins Dallas and Bonnie there before it closes, hoping to find Alex.
50	11	"Follow You Down"	Heather Hemmens	Steve Stringer & Danny Tolli	August 22, 2022	0.36
Liz's friends stage an intervention to get her to stop taking the mist, but before they can finish she is abducted by Clyde. He explains Theo set the portal to not let through anyone wearing Jones' mark so he wants Liz to remove his. Max tries to get some mist to get his powers back but Shivani refuses to hand it over. Clyde is mind-controlling Vanessa and threatens to force her to jump unless Liz co-operates. Rosa is able to break the control. Liz tricks Clyde, collapsing a tunnel on him and giving him an injection to remove his powers. He escapes after severing his hand. Michael, Dallas and Bonnie track down Alex. He asks Michael to marry him but also reveals the dimension is toxic to humans and he is dying of radiation poisoning. They are also unable to find fruit to get out. Clyde goes to Shivani offering an alliance.
51	12	"Two Sparrows in a Hurricane"	John Hyams	Jenny Phillips & Onalee Hunter Hughes	August 29, 2022	0.46
Liz gives Max the mist to restore his powers but her own abuse of it is causing her to suffer memory lapses. She works out that Clyde needs Bonnie's powers to remove his brand, meaning he's gone to the pocket dimension. Tesca trains Max to use the blue flame before he and Isobel join the others there. Michael refuses to marry Alex there, instead working out they can use the roots of the burnt trees to reactivate the portal. Liz works out the same thing. Sonia helps Maria make contact with Dallas and get instructions on how to re-open the portal. Clyde manages to get hold of Bonnie and begin removing the brand before being captured by Max and Isobel. He reveals the pocket dimension is collapsing after recognising Max and Michael have Jones' DNA. Maria and Sonia decoy Shivani while Liz, Kyle and Rosa open the portal but Clyde now has all the powers Bonnie stole and goes through the portal alone. Tesca joins the group in the pocket dimension and coaches Max to use the blue flame to slow the destruction, while Michael has Dallas retrieve tree spores to reopen the portal. Tesca also has Jones' mark so has to stay behind in the dimension's collapse as the others escape, finding Clyde waiting for them.
52	13	"How's It Going to Be"	Lance Anderson	Joel Anderson Thompson & Christopher Hollier	September 5, 2022	0.37
A stand-off ends with Rosa managing to neutralise Clyde's powers only for him to kidnap her. Liz contacts Allie for help and they and Kyle work out a way to restore Clyde's brand. Clyde takes Rosa to Shivani, claiming her blood can revive Nicole, but he actually needs it to repair the star map. Maria is able to locate Rosa so Michael, Dallas and Bonnie go to rescue her. Liz, Max and Isobel confront Clyde at the portal and Liz is able to surreptitiously inject him so he dies trying to use it. Isobel tells Max Tesca gave her a vision showing Oasis is dying and only his powers can save it. Michael and Alex marry. Max decides to go back to Oasis, as does Dallas after sharing a kiss with Maria. Rosa returns to New York while Maria gives Bonnie a job. Max and Liz get engaged before he leaves, with him promising to come back.

== Reception ==
=== Critical reception ===
The series holds an approval rating of 55% based on 20 reviews, with an average rating of 6.22/10 on Rotten Tomatoes. The website's critic consensus reads: "Roswell, New Mexico admirably adds modern political context to its premise, but this reboot hews too closely to its predecessor to transcend the pitfalls of a redundant retread." Metacritic, which uses a weighted average, assigned the series a score of 58 out of 100 based on 13 critics, indicating "mixed or average" reviews.

=== Ratings ===
==== Overall ====
Viewership and ratings per season of Roswell, New Mexico
Season	Timeslot (ET)	Episodes	First aired		Last aired		TV season	Viewership rank	Avg. viewers (millions)	18–49 rank
Season	Timeslot (ET)	Episodes	Date	Viewers (millions)	Date	Viewers (millions)	TV season	Viewership rank	Avg. viewers (millions)	18–49 rank
1	Tuesday 9:00 p.m.	13	January 15, 2019	1.51	April 23, 2019	1.03	2018–19	167	1.69	TBD
2	Monday 9:00 p.m.	13	March 16, 2020	0.75	June 15, 2020	0.65	2019–20	125	1.29	TBD
3	Monday 8:00 p.m. (1–12); Monday 9:00 p.m. (13)	13	July 26, 2021	0.61	October 11, 2021	0.38	2020–21	N/A	N/A	TBD
4	Monday 8:00 p.m.	13	June 6, 2022	0.43	September 5, 2022	0.37	2021–22	TBD	TBD	TBD

==== Season 1 ====
Viewership and ratings per episode of Roswell, New Mexico
No.	Title	Air date	Rating/share (18–49)	Viewers (millions)	DVR (18–49)	DVR viewers (millions)	Total (18–49)	Total viewers (millions)
1	"Pilot"	January 15, 2019	0.4/2	1.51	0.2	0.92	0.6	2.43
2	"So Much for the Afterglow"	January 22, 2019	0.4/2	1.21	0.2	0.91	0.6	2.12
3	"Tearin' Up My Heart"	January 29, 2019	0.3/1	1.27	0.3	0.81	0.6	2.08
4	"Where Have All the Cowboys Gone?"	February 5, 2019	0.3/1	1.12	0.3	0.92	0.6	2.04
5	"Don't Speak"	February 12, 2019	0.3/1	1.14	0.2	0.84	0.5	1.98
6	"Smells Like Teen Spirit"	February 26, 2019	0.2/1	0.89	0.2	0.78	0.4	1.67
7	"I Saw the Sign"	March 5, 2019	0.3/1	1.02	0.2	0.77	0.5	1.80
8	"Barely Breathing"	March 12, 2019	0.2/1	0.92	0.2	0.79	0.4	1.71
9	"Songs About Texas"	March 19, 2019	0.3/1	1.02	0.2	0.76	0.5	1.78
10	"I Don't Want to Miss a Thing"	March 26, 2019	0.2/1	0.92	0.2	0.74	0.4	1.66
11	"Champagne Supernova"	April 9, 2019	0.2/1	0.83	0.2	0.66	0.4	1.49
12	"Creep"	April 16, 2019	0.2/1	0.92	0.2	0.68	0.4	1.60
13	"Recovering the Satellites"	April 23, 2019	0.3/1	1.03	0.1	0.62	0.4	1.65

==== Season 2 ====
Viewership and ratings per episode of Roswell, New Mexico
No.	Title	Air date	Rating (18–49)	Viewers (millions)	DVR (18–49)	DVR viewers (millions)	Total (18–49)	Total viewers (millions)
1	"Stay (I Missed You)"	March 16, 2020	0.2	0.75	0.2	0.68	0.4	1.43
2	"Ladies and Gentlemen We Are Floating in Space"	March 23, 2020	0.2	0.82	0.1	0.55	0.3	1.37
3	"Good Mother"	March 30, 2020	0.1	0.63	0.2	0.67	0.3	1.30
4	"What If God Was One of Us?"	April 6, 2020	0.1	0.63	0.2	0.61	0.3	1.24
5	"I'll Stand By You"	April 13, 2020	0.1	0.67	0.2	0.59	0.3	1.26
6	"Sex and Candy"	April 20, 2020	0.1	0.68	0.2	0.62	0.3	1.30
7	"Como La Flor"	April 27, 2020	0.2	0.76	0.2	0.50	0.4	1.26
8	"Say It Ain't So"	May 4, 2020	0.1	0.64	0.2	0.59	0.3	1.25
9	"The Diner"	May 11, 2020	0.1	0.68	0.2	0.58	0.3	1.26
10	"American Woman"	May 18, 2020	0.1	0.65	0.2	0.57	0.3	1.22
11	"Linger"	June 1, 2020	0.1	0.54	0.2	0.55	0.3	1.09
12	"Crash Into Me"	June 8, 2020	0.1	0.66	0.2	0.52	0.3	1.18
13	"Mr. Jones"	June 15, 2020	0.1	0.65	0.2	0.52	0.3	1.17

==== Season 3 ====
Viewership and ratings per episode of Roswell, New Mexico
No.	Title	Air date	Rating/share (18–49)	Viewers (millions)	DVR (18–49)	DVR viewers (millions)	Total (18–49)	Total viewers (millions)
1	"Hands"	July 26, 2021	0.1	0.61	0.1	0.35	0.2	0.96
2	"Give Me One Reason"	August 2, 2021	0.1	0.64	0.1	0.30	0.2	0.94
3	"Black Hole Sun"	August 9, 2021	0.1	0.65	0.1	0.39	0.2	1.04
4	"Walk on the Ocean"	August 16, 2021	0.1	0.64	0.1	0.32	0.2	0.96
5	"Killing Me Softly with His Song"	August 23, 2021	0.1	0.63	TBD	TBD	TBD	TBD
6	"Bittersweet Symphony"	August 30, 2021	0.1	0.64	TBD	TBD	TBD	TBD
7	"Goodnight Elizabeth"	September 6, 2021	0.1	0.58	TBD	TBD	TBD	TBD
8	"Free Your Mind"	September 13, 2021	0.1	0.53	TBD	TBD	TBD	TBD
9	"Tones of Home"	September 20, 2021	0.1	0.47	TBD	TBD	TBD	TBD
10	"Angels of the Silences"	September 27, 2021	0.1	0.46	TBD	TBD	TBD	TBD
11	"2 Became 1"	October 4, 2021	0.1	0.47	TBD	TBD	TBD	TBD
12	"I Ain't Goin' Out Like That"	October 11, 2021	0.1	0.44	0.1	0.33	0.1	0.77
13	"Never Let You Go"	October 11, 2021	0.1	0.38	0.1	0.42	0.2	0.80

==== Season 4 ====
Viewership and ratings per episode of Roswell, New Mexico
No.	Title	Air date	Rating (18–49)	Viewers (millions)
1	"Steal My Sunshine"	June 6, 2022	0.1	0.43
2	"Fly"	June 13, 2022	0.1	0.47
3	"Subterranean Homesick Alien"	June 20, 2022	0.1	0.46
4	"Dear Mama"	June 27, 2022	0.1	0.45
5	"You Get What You Give"	July 11, 2022	0.1	0.44
6	"Kiss From a Rose"	July 18, 2022	0.1	0.43
7	"Dig Me Out"	July 25, 2022	0.1	0.50
8	"Missing My Baby"	August 1, 2022	0.0	0.44
9	"Wild Wild West"	August 8, 2022	0.1	0.40
10	"Down in a Hole"	August 15, 2022	0.1	0.49
11	"Follow You Down"	August 22, 2022	0.0	0.36
12	"Two Sparrows in a Hurricane"	August 29, 2022	0.1	0.46
13	"How's It Going to Be"	September 5, 2022	0.1	0.37

== Home media ==
Warner Archive Collection released a manufacture-on-demand DVD of the first season on January 28, 2020.
