= Matthew Cowles =

American actor (1944–2014)

- Cowles in 1966
- Born: September 28, 1944; New York City, U.S.
- Died: May 22, 2014 (aged 69); New York City, U.S.
- Occupation: Actor
- Years active: 1966–2014
- Spouses: Kathleen Dezina (m. 1980; div. 1982) Christine Baranski (m. 1983)
- Children: 2, including Lily Cowles
- Parent: Chandler Cowles (father)

Matthew Cowles (September 28, 1944 – May 22, 2014) was an American actor and playwright.

== Early life ==
Matthew Cowles was born on September 28, 1944, in New York City, the son of actor and theater producer Chandler Cowles and his first wife, Katharine Drexel Henry.

== Career ==
In 1966, Cowles played the title role in Edward Albee's short-lived adaptation of James Purdy's comic novel Malcolm on Broadway at the Shubert Theatre.

In 1968, he appeared with Al Pacino and John Cazale in Israel Horovitz's The Indian Wants the Bronx.

In 1983, Cowles joined The Mirror Theater Ltd's Mirror Repertory Company for their first repertory season, performing in Paradise Lost, Rain, Inheritors, and The Hasty Heart.

Cowles's first television rolewas Joe Czernak in the series NYPD in 1969. He was nominated for a Daytime Emmy as Outstanding Actor in a Daytime Drama Series in 1978 and as Outstanding Supporting Actor in a Daytime Drama Series in 1981, both for his part as Billy Clyde Tuggle in All My Children, a role that he created and wrote.

Cowles's first film was the comedy drama Me, Natalie (1969) in which he played Harvey Belman. Al Pacino also made his debut in this film.

In 2010, Cowles played a supporting role in Martin Scorsese's film Shutter Island.

Cowles also starred in three short plays for the public radio show and podcast Playing on Air.

== Personal life and death ==
In 1983, Cowles married actress Christine Baranski, with whom he had two daughters, Isabel (born 1984) and Lily (born 1987). In a New York Times profile of his wife, he was described as "the black sheep member of a family with ties to Cowles publishing and Drexel banking". He was an enthusiastic motorcycle rider.

Cowles was a devout Catholic and taught religious education at the Church of the Nativity in Bethlehem, Connecticut. He was the first cousin twice removed of the American saint Katharine Drexel.

Cowles died from congestive heart failure on May 22, 2014.

== Filmography ==
=== Film ===
- Me, Natalie (1969) as Harvey Belman
- The Friends of Eddie Coyle (1973) as Pete
- The Happy Hooker (1975) as Albert Ruffleson
- Slap Shot (1977) as Charlie
- The World According to Garp (1982) as O. Fecteau
- Eddie Macon's Run (1983) as Ray Banes
- The Money Pit (1986) as Marty
- Stars and Bars (1988) as Beckman Gage
- White Fang 2: Myth of the White Wolf (1994) as Lloyd Halverson
- The Cowboy Way (1994) as Popfly
- The Juror (1996) as Rodney
- Nurse Betty (2000) as Merle
- Shutter Island (2010) as Ferry Boat Captain

=== Television ===
Matthew Cowles television credits
Year	Title	Role	Notes	Ref.
1977–2011	All My Children	Billy Clyde Tuggle	Regular cast (1977–1980, 1984, 1989–1990, 2011)	
1983	As the World Turns	Lonnie		
1985	Love on the Run	Yancy	TV movie	
1986, 1987	Loving	Eban Japes	2 episodes	
1987	The Equalizer	Rapist #2	Episode: "Nightscape"	
1989	Lonesome Dove	Monkey John	TV miniseries	
1991	Law & Order	Christian 'Lemonhead' Tatum	Episode: "Asylum"	
1997	The Bold and the Beautiful	Curtis Love	13 episodes	
2003	Oz	Willy Brandt	3 episodes	
2008	Law & Order: Special Victims Unit	Cyrus Wert	Episode: "Undercover"	
2008–2009	Life on Mars	Cowboy Dan	4 episodes	

== Stage credits ==
- Malcolm (1966) Broadway as Malcolm.
- The Indian Wants the Bronx (1968), Astor Place Theatre
- The Time of Your Life (1969) as Dudley
- Sweet Bird of Youth (1975–1976) as Tom Junior
- Dirty Jokes (1976) at the Academy Festival Theatre in Chicago, Illinois

== Bibliography ==
=== Plays ===
- Mexican Standoff at Fat Squaw Springs
- Our Daily Bread
- Noblesse Oblige
