= Lily Cowles =

American actress

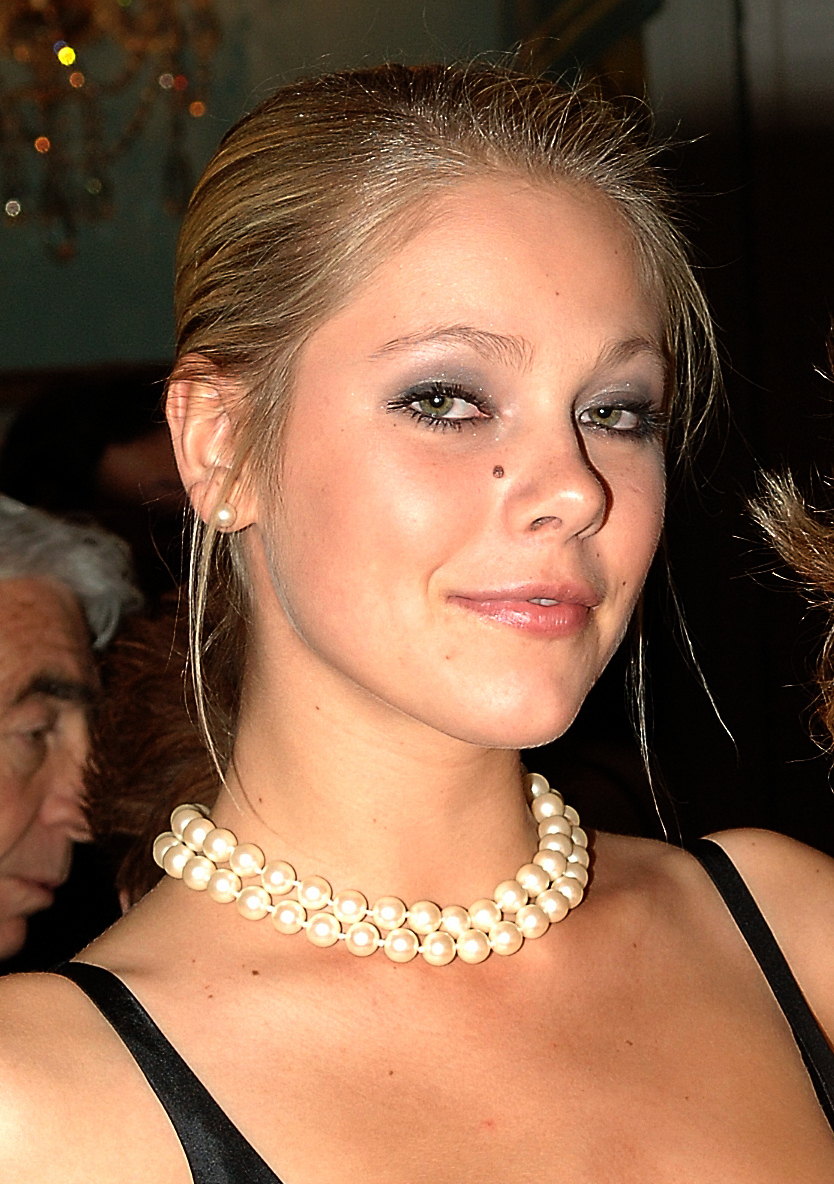
- Cowles in 2007
- Born: September 7, 1987 (age 38)
- Education: Princeton University (BA)
- Occupation: Actress
- Years active: 2015–present
- Known for: Roswell, New Mexico as Isobel Evans; Call of Duty: Black Ops Cold War and Call of Duty: Mobile as Helen Park
- Parents: Matthew Cowles (father); Christine Baranski (mother)
- Relatives: Chandler Cowles (grandfather)

Lily Cowles (born September 7, 1987) is an American actress known for her role as Isobel Evans in Roswell, New Mexico and Helen Park in Call of Duty: Black Ops Cold War.

== Early life and education ==
Cowles was born in 1987 and raised in rural Connecticut, the daughter of actress Christine Baranski and actor and playwright Matthew Cowles. Cowles has an older sister, an attorney named Isabel. Cowles earned a Bachelor of Arts degree in religious studies from Princeton University. Cowles' father died of congestive heart failure in 2014.

== Career ==
After graduating from Princeton, Cowles relocated to Los Angeles. She began her career in entertainment as a personal assistant to Jonah Hill during the production of True Story. In 2015, she had her acting debut in Enchantments.

In 2016, Cowles also had a recurring role in the political satire, BrainDead. Cowles was later cast in the CW reboot of Roswell, titled Roswell, New Mexico. 2020 saw Cowles play the role of Helen Park in the first-person shooter video game Call of Duty: Black Ops Cold War.

== Filmography ==
Year	Title	Role	Notes
2015	Enchantments	Bitch Customer	Film
2016	BrainDead	Germaine Healy	4 episodes
2017	Joe Goes to Therapy		TV movie
2017	Jones vs. the World	Aimee	TV series
2018	Stages of Android	Lily	Short
2019–2022	Roswell, New Mexico	Isobel Evans	Main role; 52 episodes
2020	Antebellum	Sarah	Film
2020	Call of Duty: Black Ops Cold War	Helen Park	Video game
2020	Call of Duty: Mobile	Helen Park	Video game
2023	Immortals of Aveum	Zendara	Video game
2024	Albany Road	Andrea	
2024	Call of Duty: Black Ops 6	Helen Park	Video game
2024	Secret Level	Kara Voss	Episode: "Exodus: Odyssey"; voice
