= Chandler Cowles =

American screenwriter

- Born: Chandler Ruel Cowles; September 29, 1917; New Haven, Connecticut, U.S.
- Died: February 1, 1997 (aged 79); New York City, U.S.
- Occupations: Actor, theatrical producer
- Spouse(s): Katherine Drexel Henry (m. 1941; div. 1949); Lenore Lonergan (m. 1951; div. 1954); Adrienne Kathleen Zuckert (m. 1969; div. 1976); Pavlina Dokovska (m. 1990)
- Children: Matthew Cowles
- Relatives: Lily Cowles (granddaughter)

Chandler Ruel Cowles (September 29, 1917 – February 1, 1997) was an American actor, producer, and co-producer in at least eleven New York theatrical productions from 1946 through 1960. He was also an Emmy-nominated writer and producer, for his work on the 1983 CBS documentary, I, Leonardo: A Journey of the Mind.

== Early life ==
Cowles was born on September 29, 1917, in New Haven, Connecticut. one of two sons born to Elfrida (née Scofield) and Professor Walter Ruel Cowles, head of the University of Florida's music department. He attended Florida High School.

After attending Yale, Cowles served in the Navy, thus setting the stage for what, beginning in the years immediately following his emergence as a Broadway producer and referenced as recently as 2025, has arguably become the incident for which Cowles is best remembered, specifically, for being stationed aboard the U.S.S. California, as it was torpedoed and sunk on December 7, 1941 at Pearl Harbor.

== Career ==
Cowles was the executive producer of the American Shakespeare Festival in Stratford, Connecticut in 1955. In February 1956 he was named general manager of N. B. C. Opera.

Cowles was co-producer with Efrem Zimbalist Jr. for Gian-Carlo Menotti's The Medium and The Telephone. He was a lifelong friend of ballet legend George Balanchine, with whom he worked on the 1947 Broadway production of The Telephone/The Medium. He also wrote the 1983 television documentary I, Leonardo: A Journey of the Mind, for which he received Emmy nominations, as both writer and producer.

On Broadway he performed in Call Me Mister (1946), The Cradle Will Rock (1947), and Small Wonder. Broadway shows that he produced included The Telephone/The Medium (1947), The Consul (1950), Billy Budd (1951), Fancy Meeting You Again (1952), Men of Distinction (1953), The Saint of Bleecker Street (1954), Transposed Heads (1958), and Caligula (1960).

== Personal life and death ==
Cowles' first marriage was to Katharine Drexel Henry, and began on June 4, 1941 at the Church of St. Vincent Ferrer, on Manhattan's Upper East Side. It ended via divorce circa 1949, but not before producing sons Christopher and actor Matthew Chandler Cowles. His second marriage, to actress Lenore Lonergan, was relatively short-lived: married, July 1951; estranged, circa 12/52; sued and promptly divorced—albeit with original alimony request withdrawn—by November 1954. Notwithstanding a widespread but never confirmed 1957 rumor regarding Cowles "tak[ing] his next aisle-waltz with the beautiful Duchess of Hapsburg", (Note: A prediction attributed to "Cafe Society' by syndicated gossip columnist Dorothy Kilgallen.) there appears to have been a near 15-year hiatus between his 1954 divorce and marriage number three, in 1969, to NBC News associate producer (and daughter of the former U.S. Secretary of the Air Force), Adrienne Zuckert. Although she was still being billed as Adrienne Cowles at least as late as 1981, a profile published that same year of NBC-TV President Robert Mulholland reveals that his then current wife—ever since their marriage on January 2, 1977–was none other than that same-named veteran NBC News producer. Thus, it is safe to assume that Chandler Cowles' third and final divorce occurred no later than 1976. His fourth and final marriage was to Bulgarian pianist Pavlina Dokovska.

On February 1, 1997, at the age of 79, Chandler Cowles suffered a fatal heart attack in New York City. He was survived by his wife, his two sons, and two grandchildren.
