= Rachel Raimist =

American television director

Rachel Raimist is an American episodic television director.

== Early life and education ==
Raimist was born and raised in Middletown, New York in Orange County. She attended Middletown High School where at the urging of teacher Fred Isseks, she made the documentary Garbage, Gangsters and Greed.

The feature documentary Middletown follows Isseks and his students, including Raimist, and is directed by Emmy and Sundance-winning filmmakers Jesse Moss and Amanda McBaine. Middletown premiered at the 2025 Sundance Film Festival. This film was renamed as Teenage Wasteland and streams on Netflix on September 4, 2026.

Raimist attended the UCLA School of Film and Television where she earned a bachelor's degree in film and television production and a MFA in directing. Raimist returned to graduate studies at the University of Minnesota, Minneapolis in 2002. She earned a Master of Arts in women's studies and a Ph.D. in feminist studies with a minor in American studies in 2010.

In 2009, the Gender, Women and Sexuality Studies Department at the University of Minnesota, Minneapolis named The Rachel Raimist Feminist Media Center in her honor, for her work building gender infused gender curriculum, community events, teaching and mentorship of students to develop as digital storytellers and feminist filmmakers.

== Career ==
Raimist has directed numerous hours of television, with credits in drama, action, sci-fi, musicals and comedy. In 2026, Raimist was appointed to a full professorship as the Morgan Woodward Endowed Distinguished Professor of Film at the University of Texas, Arlington.

=== Television credits ===
Year	Show	Episode Title	Role
2018	Queen Sugar	Your Passages Have Been Paid	Director
2019	Greenleaf	Did I Lose You	Director
2019-2021	Roswell, New Mexico	Say It Ain't So; Killing Me Softly With His Song; Bittersweet Symphony	Director
2019-2020	Nancy Drew	The Secret of the Solitary Scribe	Director
2021	The Republic of Sarah	From Simple Sources; Pledge Allegiance	Director
2021	Diary of a Future President	Swing State	Director
2021	The Sex Lives of College Girls	That Comment Tho	Director
2021	Wu-Tang: An American Saga	Saturday Nite	Director
2021-2023	Fantasy Island	Dia de los Vivos; Paymer vs. Paymer	Director
2021	The Big Leap	Nothing but Money Shots	Director
2021	4400	If You Love Something	Director
2021	Queens	Bars	Director
2022	Wild Life	Pilot	Director and EP
2022-2023	CSI: Las Vegas	When the Dust Settles	Director
2023	Sex/Life	The Weakness in Me	Director
2023	Up Here	Baggage	Director
2024	The Spiderwick Chronicles	A Midsummer's Daydream	Director
2024	Bel-Air	Gimme a Break	Director
2024	Elsbeth	Gold, Frankincense & Murder	Director

== Leadership ==
Raimist is active in leadership at the Directors Guild of America where she was the first appointed to co-chair the Disability Committee and the first woman appointed to Co-chair The Special Projects Committee.
