= Fracture Jaw =

U.S. military contingency plan during the Vietnam War

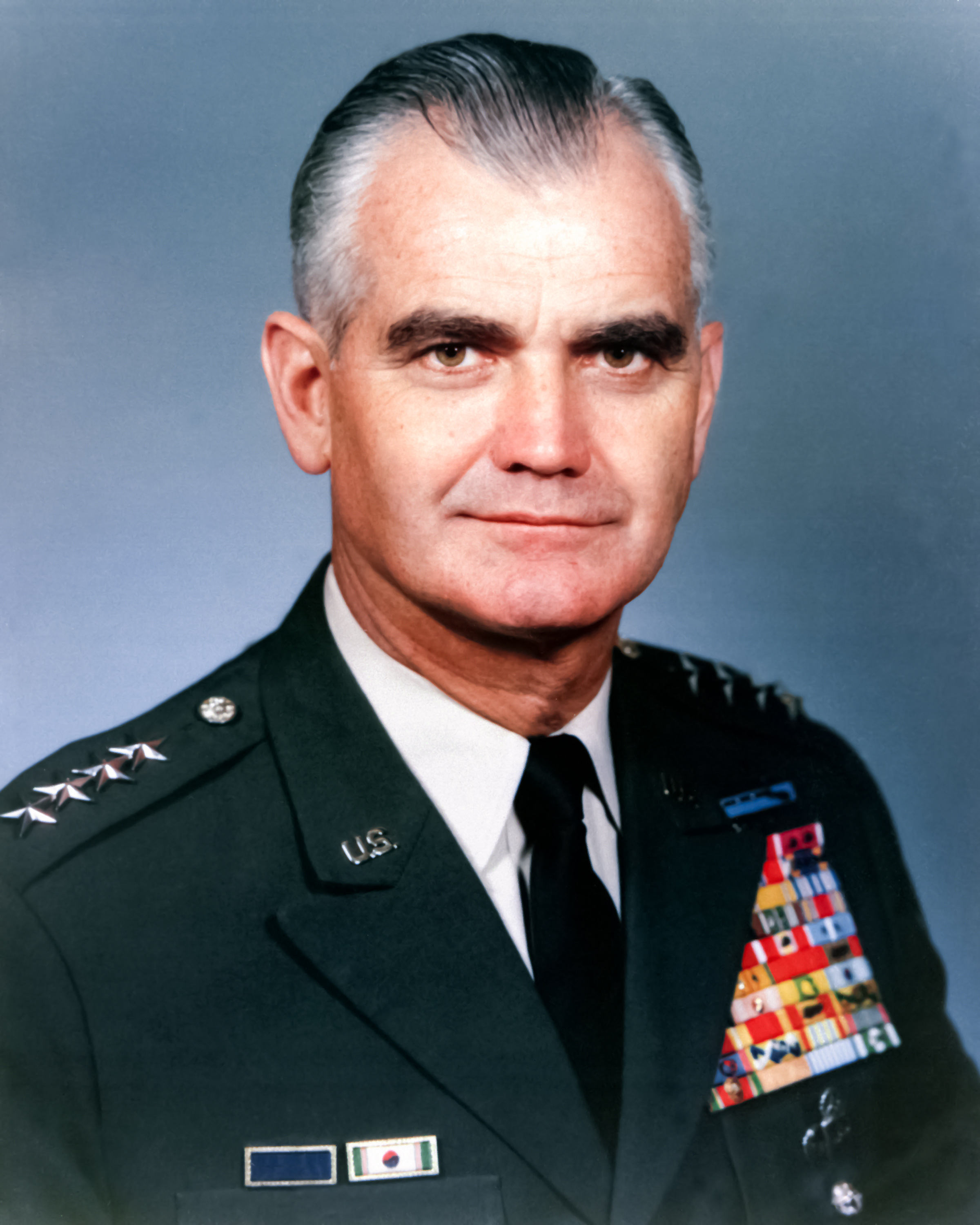
William C. Westmoreland

Fracture Jaw was a top-secret U.S. military contingency plan in which Army Chief of Staff William C. Westmoreland sought to ensure that nuclear weapons would be available for use in the Vietnam War. Planning began in 1968 and included moving nuclear weapons into South Vietnam so that they could be used on short notice against North Vietnamese troops. In spite of moves towards activating the plan, the project was abandoned in February 1968 after public statements by Eugene McCarthy and others claimed that the U.S. was preparing to use nuclear weapons in Vietnam.

== In popular culture ==
Operation Fracture Jaw is featured in Treyarch's 2020 video game, Call of Duty: Black Ops Cold War.
