= Evidence board =

Television and film trope

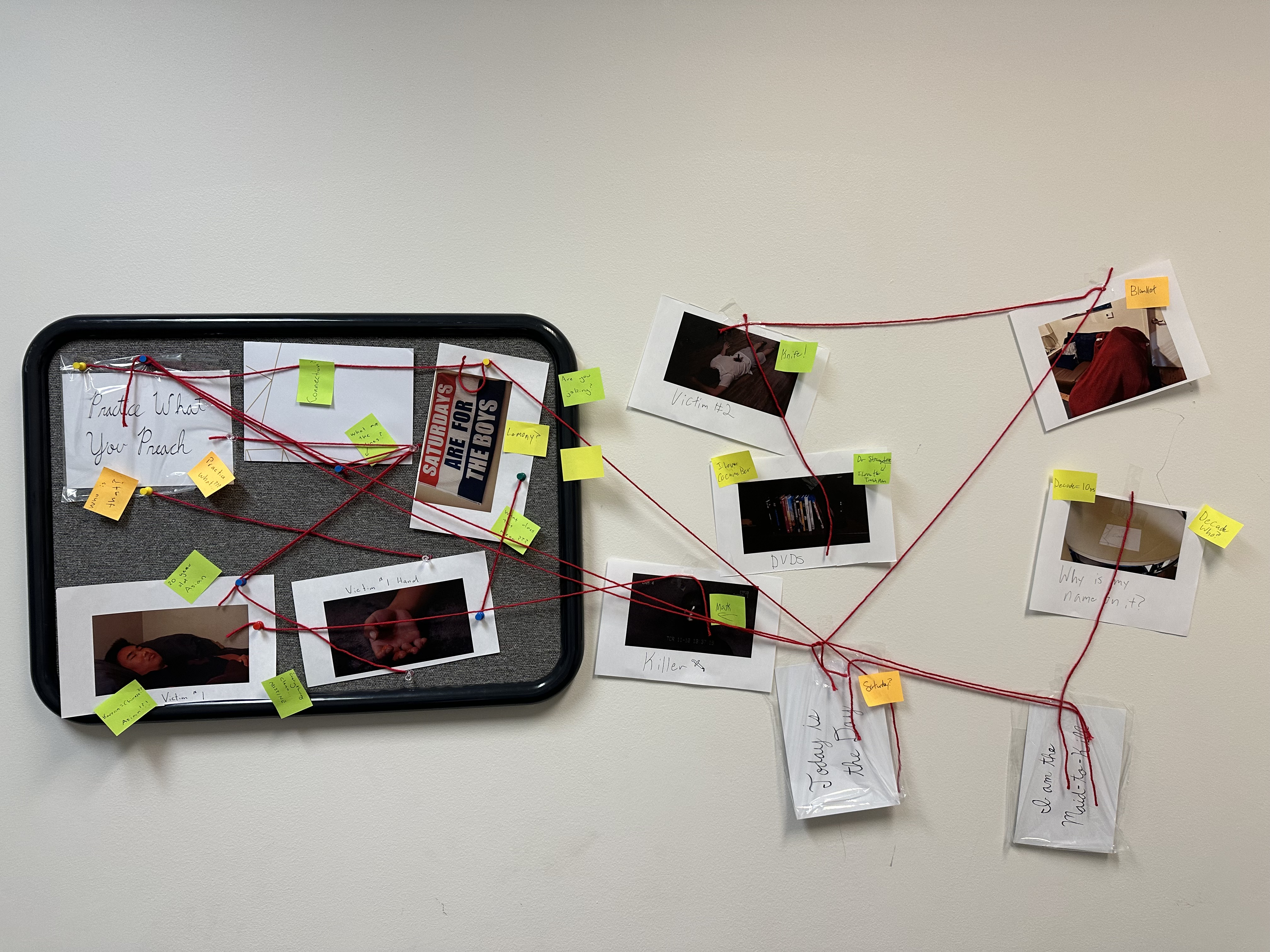
An evidence board on the set of a film

An evidence board (also known as a "conspiracy board," "crazy wall," or "murder map") is a common background feature in thriller and detective fiction movies and TV. It features a collage of media from different sources, pinned to a pinboard or stuck to a wall, and frequently interconnected with (usually red) string to mark connections. A more technical related name for these sorts of visualizations and charts within law enforcement are Anacapa charts which are used for social network analysis.

Evidence boards are associated in fiction with both detective activities and obsessional interests, including those of delusional individuals pursuing conspiracy theories, hence the alternative names. Evidence boards can be seen in numerous TV series, including The Bridge, BoJack Horseman, Fargo, Homeland, Sherlock, and True Detective. An evidence board is the central motif in the title sequence of A Series of Unfortunate Events. Evidence boards have also been used as a teaching tool.

== See also ==
- Concept map
- Link analysis
- Mind map
- Network science
- Red thread of fate
