= Teufelsburg (Saarland) =

Castle ruin in Felsberg, Saarland, Germany

- Burg Neufilsberg, Neufelsberg
- Felsberg
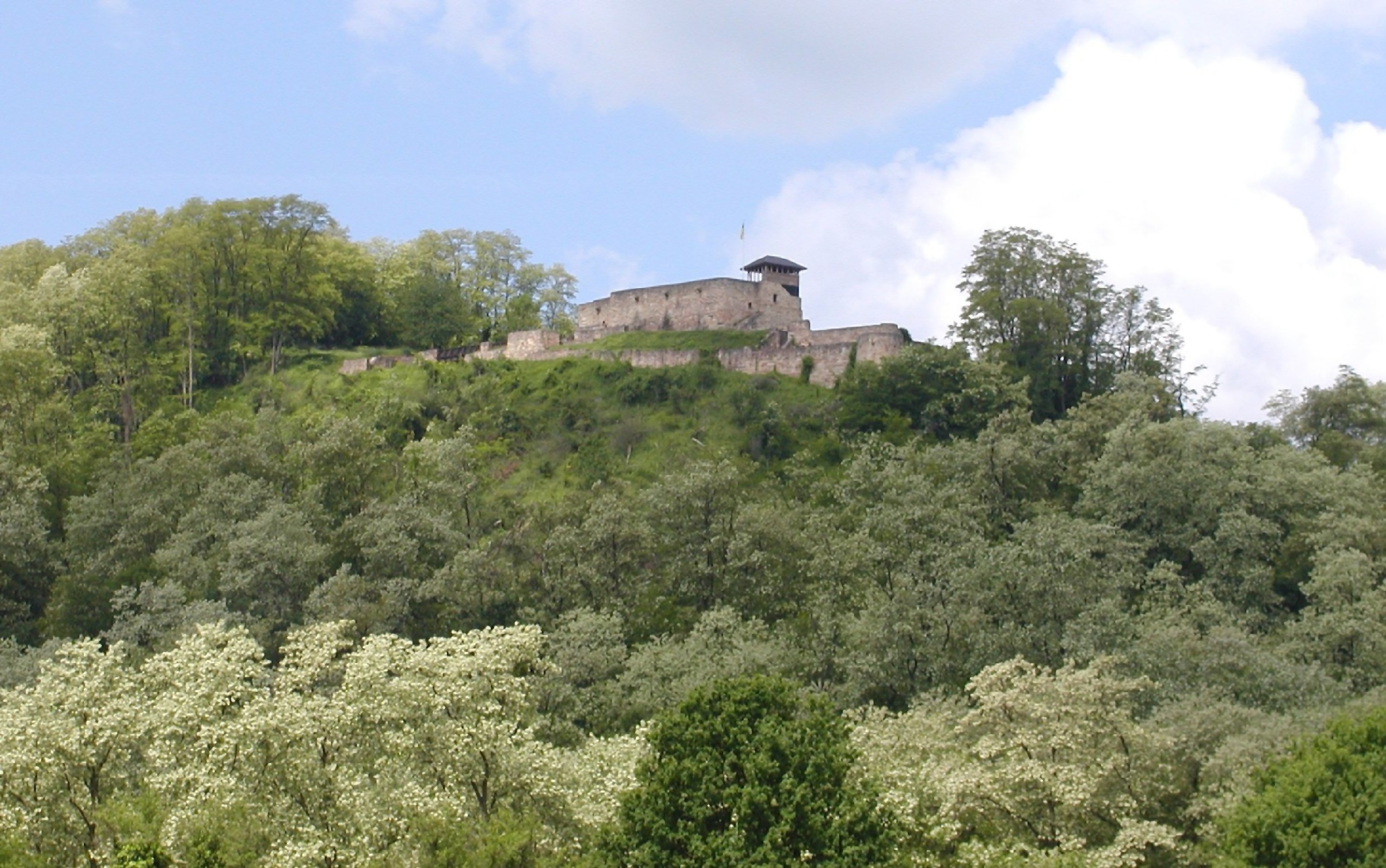
- The Teufelsburg in Felsberg

Site information
- Type: hill castle, spur castle
- Code: DE-SL
- Condition: ruin

Location
- Coordinates: 49°18′7.93″N 06°41′40.1″E
- Height: 320 m above sea level (NHN)

Site history
- Built: 1360
- Materials: Sandstone from Felsberg - renovated 2009–2010

Garrison information
- Occupants: Duke of Lorraine

The Teufelsburg is a castle ruin in Felsberg in the community of Überherrn, Saarland, Germany. The historical name of the castle is Neu-Felsberg.

== Location ==
The Teufelsburg castle ruin lies to the west of Saarlouis on the edge of the middle Saartal at a height of 320 m above Sea level. The castle is north of Felsberg and is easily reached from Upper Felsberg as well as via the Vauban-Steig, a designated premium hiking path. The castle offers its visitors a sweeping overview of the Saartal and the Hunsrück.

== History of the castle ==
=== Construction and destruction ===
Following the destruction of the Altenfelsberg Castle in 1341 by the electoral prince and archbishop Baldwin of Luxembourg, Duke Johann I of Lorraine built this spur castle from 1354 to 1360. The first documented reference to the castle as "Neufilsberg" (= Neu-Felsberg) dates to 1370, and the first knight of Neufelsberg Castle was Arnold von Filsberg - a grandson of Arnold von der Brücke, Lord of Siersburg and Felsberg. The final historical reference to the castle occurs in 1699 when it was already in ruins and no longer inhabited. The stones from the castle were used in 1680 by the French for the building of the fortified city of Saarlouis.

=== Excavation and partial reconstruction ===
The ruins are made up of the remnants of two castles – an upper, older castle and a lower castle. Following a complete measurement of the castle grounds by Bernd Richter, a model of the lower castle was created that ultimately led to the site's excavation and the lower castle's rebuilding in 1968 according to the existing foundations with a restoration that lasted from 2009 to 2010. By contrast, after being plundered for stones in 1680, the upper castle was never restored.

=== Legend ===
The popular name Teufelsburg or "Devil's Castle" can be traced back to a local legend in which a knight of the castle made a pact with the devil to whom the knight sold his soul before engaging in a duel. The sound of his screams as he entered Hell are still said to be heard today.

Visitors to the castle can arrange for a tour of the small museum inside the castle which contains finds from the excavations. Since April 2007, the museum displays tools and utensils from the castle mountain's sandstone quarry as well as fossils and minerals from the Felsberg. Most visitors, however, are attracted to the sweeping panorama of Saarlouis and the Saartal.
