= 2017 in downloadable songs for the Rock Band series =

- Songs released: 135
- Packs released: 11
- Albums released: 0

The Rock Band series of music video games supports downloadable songs for the Xbox One and PlayStation 4 versions through the consoles' respective online services. Users can download songs on a track-by-track basis, with many of the tracks also offered as part of a "song pack" or complete album at a discounted rate.

Rock Band VR was released on March 23, 2017.

== List of songs released in 2017 ==
The following table lists the available songs for the Rock Band series released in 2017. All songs available in packs are also available as individual song downloads on the same date, unless otherwise noted. Dates listed are the initial release of songs on PlayStation Network and Xbox Live.

Starting from October 6, 2015, all music added to the downloadable content catalog is exclusive to Rock Band 4. In addition, due to changes in the charting format and gameplay of Rock Band 4, the released songs no longer support keyboard or Pro guitar and bass (future downloadable content will continue to support vocal harmonies and Pro drum charts), and most songs no longer display "family friendly" or "supervision recommended" ratings. Downloadable content from previous Rock Band titles (excepting The Beatles: Rock Band) is forward-compatible in Rock Band 4 within the same system family (Xbox 360 downloads are usable in the Xbox One version and PlayStation 3 downloads are usable in the PlayStation 4 version) at no additional cost.

| Song title | Artist | Year | Genre | Single / Pack name | Release date |
|---|---|---|---|---|---|
| "The Stage" | Avenged Sevenfold | 2016 | Metal | More Metal 01 | Jan 5, 2017 |
| "Trust" | Megadeth | 1997 | Metal | More Metal 01 | Jan 5, 2017 |
| "Dead Memories" | Slipknot | 2008 | Nu-Metal | More Metal 01 | Jan 5, 2017 |
| "Swing, Swing" (Note: Song was previously included in Lego Rock Band.) | The All-American Rejects | 2003 | Emo | Single | Jan 12, 2017 |
| "Some Nights" | fun. | 2012 | Pop-Rock | Single | Jan 12, 2017 |
| "Cheerleader (Felix Jaehn Remix)" | OMI | 2015 | Pop/Dance/Electronic | Single | Jan 12, 2017 |
| "Hold the Line" | Toto | 1978 | Pop-Rock | Solid '70s 01 | Jan 19, 2017 |
| "Carry On Wayward Son" (Note: Song was previously included in Rock Band 2.) | Kansas | 1976 | Prog | Solid '70s 01 | Jan 19, 2017 |
| "(Don't Fear) The Reaper" (Note: Song was previously included in Rock Band.) | Blue Öyster Cult | 1976 | Classic Rock | Solid '70s 01 | Jan 19, 2017 |
| "S.O.M.P." (Note: Song is available at no cost.) (Note: Song is exclusively available through the January update to Rock Band Rivals.) | Skratch'N Snyf | 1990 | Glam | Single | Jan 25, 2017 |
| "Applause" | Lady Gaga | 2013 | Pop/Dance/Electronic | Lady Gaga 03 | Jan 26, 2017 |
| "A-YO" | Lady Gaga | 2016 | Pop/Dance/Electronic | Lady Gaga 03 | Jan 26, 2017 |
| "The Edge of Glory" | Lady Gaga | 2011 | Pop/Dance/Electronic | Lady Gaga 03 | Jan 26, 2017 |
| "I Wanna Rock" | Twisted Sister | 1984 | Glam | Single | Feb 2, 2017 |
| "Round and Round" | Ratt | 1984 | Glam | Single | Feb 2, 2017 |
| "I Will Survive" | Cake | 1996 | Alternative | Pack à Trois | Feb 9, 2017 |
| "Want to Want Me" | Jason Derulo | 2015 | Pop/Dance/Electronic | Pack à Trois | Feb 9, 2017 |
| "Don't You (Forget About Me)" | Simple Minds | 1985 | New Wave | Pack à Trois | Feb 9, 2017 |
| "Nine in the Afternoon" | Panic! at the Disco | 2008 | Emo | Single | Feb 16, 2017 |
| "In Too Deep" | Sum 41 | 2001 | Punk | Single | Feb 16, 2017 |
| "Ace of Spades '08" | Motörhead | 1980 | Metal | Single | Feb 23, 2017 |
| "Black Betty" | Ram Jam | 1977 | Classic Rock | Single | Feb 23, 2017 |
| "My Own Worst Enemy" | Lit | 1999 | Pop-Rock | Single | Mar 2, 2017 |
| "Outside" | Staind | 2001 | Nu-Metal | Single | Mar 2, 2017 |
| "That's What You Get" | Paramore | 2007 | Pop-Rock | Single | Mar 9, 2017 |
| "Can't Hold Us" | Macklemore & Ryan Lewis ft. Ray Dalton | 2012 | Hip-Hop/Rap | Single | Mar 9, 2017 |
| "Danger Zone" | Kenny Loggins | 1986 | Pop-Rock | Single | Mar 16, 2017 |
| "Sink" (Note: Song is exclusively available through the March update to Rock Band Rivals.) | Animal Flag | 2016 | Indie Rock | Single | Mar 16, 2017 |
| "These Hands" | Bent Knee | 2016 | Indie Rock | Single | Mar 16, 2017 |
| "No Place for Me" | Black Beach | 2016 | Rock | Single | Mar 16, 2017 |
| "History Repeats" | Creaturos | 2016 | Rock | Single | Mar 16, 2017 |
| "RudeBoys" | Dutch ReBelle | 2016 | Hip-Hop/Rap | Single | Mar 16, 2017 |
| "Hurry Up (& Wait for You)" | Julie Rhodes | 2016 | Indie Rock | Single | Mar 16, 2017 |
| "Casablanca" | Littlefoot | 2016 | Pop-Rock | Single | Mar 16, 2017 |
| "Cross That Line" | Michael Christmas | 2016 | Hip-Hop/Rap | Single | Mar 16, 2017 |
| "Skydiver" | Ruby Rose Fox | 2016 | Indie Rock | Single | Mar 16, 2017 |
| "Good" | STL GLD | 2016 | Hip-Hop/Rap | Single | Mar 16, 2017 |
| "Alone Time" | Tigerman WOAH | 2016 | Rock | Single | Mar 16, 2017 |
| "Use Somebody" | Kings of Leon | 2008 | Rock | Single | Mar 23, 2017 |
| "I Will Wait" | Mumford & Sons | 2012 | Rock | Single | Mar 23, 2017 |
| "Counting Stars" | OneRepublic | 2013 | Pop-Rock | Single | Mar 23, 2017 |
| "Promise Everything" | Basement | 2016 | Alternative | Single | Mar 30, 2017 |
| "Shape of You" | Ed Sheeran | 2017 | Pop-Rock | Single | Mar 30, 2017 |
| "One Way or Another" | Blondie | 1978 | Pop-Rock | Single | Apr 6, 2017 |
| "You Make My Dreams" | Hall & Oates | 1980 | Pop-Rock | Single | Apr 6, 2017 |
| "Glass House" | Kaleo | 2016 | Rock | Single | Apr 13, 2017 |
| "Bizarre Love Triangle" | New Order | 1986 | New Wave | Single | Apr 13, 2017 |
| "Free Bird" (Note: Song was previously included in Rock Band 3.) | Lynyrd Skynyrd | 1973 | Southern Rock | Single | Apr 20, 2017 |
| "Champagne Supernova" | Oasis | 1995 | Rock | Single | Apr 20, 2017 |
| "Beast and the Harlot" | Avenged Sevenfold | 2005 | Metal | Single | Apr 27, 2017 |
| "Heaven Knows" | The Pretty Reckless | 2014 | Rock | Single | Apr 27, 2017 |
| "This Is How We Do It" | Montell Jordan | 1995 | Hip-Hop/Rap | Single | May 4, 2017 |
| "Kids" | MGMT | 2007 | Pop/Dance/Electronic | Single | May 11, 2017 |
| "Mother Mother" | Tracy Bonham | 1996 | Alternative | Single | May 11, 2017 |
| "Shout" | The Isley Brothers | 1959 | R&B/Soul/Funk | Single | May 18, 2017 |
| "Bored to Death" | Blink-182 | 2016 | Punk | Single | May 25, 2017 |
| "You & Me" | The Hunna | 2016 | Indie Rock | Single | May 25, 2017 |
| "Pull Me Under" | Dream Theater | 1992 | Prog | Single | Jun 8, 2017 |
| "Circles" | Pierce the Veil | 2016 | Emo | Single | Jun 8, 2017 |
| "Killing Is Just a Means" | Permaband | 2014 | Rock | Single | Jun 15, 2017 |
| "Wrecking Machine" | Permaband | 2016 | Rock | Single | Jun 15, 2017 |
| "Girls Just Want to Have Fun" | Cyndi Lauper | 1983 | Pop-Rock | Single | Jun 22, 2017 |
| "Ain't It Fun" | Paramore | 2013 | Pop-Rock | Single | Jun 22, 2017 |
| "Go Your Own Way" | Fleetwood Mac | 1977 | Classic Rock | Single | Jun 29, 2017 |
| "Freewill" (Vault Edition) | Rush | 1980 | Prog | Single | Jun 29, 2017 |
| "Down with the Sickness" | Disturbed | 2000 | Nu-Metal | Single | Jul 6, 2017 |
| "Cirice" | Ghost | 2015 | Metal | Single | Jul 6, 2017 |
| "In-A-Gadda-Da-Vida" | Iron Butterfly | 1968 | Classic Rock | Single | Jul 13, 2017 |
| "She" | Legitimate Front | 2012 | R&B/Soul/Funk | Single | Jul 18, 2017 |
| "Gold on the Ceiling" | The Black Keys | 2011 | Rock | Single | Jul 20, 2017 |
| "Hold On" | Wilson Phillips | 1990 | Pop-Rock | Single | Jul 20, 2017 |
| "Alive" | The Temper Trap | 2016 | Indie Rock | Single | Jul 27, 2017 |
| "Testify" | Rage Against the Machine | 1999 | Alternative | Single | Jul 27, 2017 |
| "True Confessions" | Blondfire | 2016 | Indie Rock | Single | Aug 3, 2017 |
| "Rebel Heart" | The Shelters | 2016 | Rock | Single | Aug 3, 2017 |
| "Sweater Weather" (Note: Song is exclusively available to Rock Band Rivals owners.) | Parks | 2012 | Pop-Rock | Single | Aug 10, 2017 |
| "To My Romeo" | Spirit Kid | 2016 | Pop-Rock | Single | Aug 10, 2017 |
| "Black Seas" | Arctic Horror | 2016 | Metal | Single | Aug 17, 2017 |
| "(You're) Breakin' Up" | The Black Cheers | 2015 | Punk | Single | Aug 17, 2017 |
| "Stupid Girl" | Garbage | 1995 | Alternative | Single | Aug 24, 2017 |
| "Every Morning" | Sugar Ray | 1999 | Alternative | Single | Aug 24, 2017 |
| "Postpone" | Catfish and the Bottlemen | 2016 | Indie Rock | Single | Aug 31, 2017 |
| "Stranglehold" | Ted Nugent | 1975 | Classic Rock | Single | Aug 31, 2017 |
| "Ice Ice Baby" | Vanilla Ice | 1990 | Hip-Hop/Rap | Single | Sep 7, 2017 |
| "I Wanna Dance with Somebody (Who Loves Me)" | Whitney Houston | 1987 | Pop/Dance/Electronic | Single | Sep 7, 2017 |
| "Won't Get Fooled Again" | The Who | 1971 | Classic Rock | Single | Sep 14, 2017 |
| "God Damn" | Avenged Sevenfold | 2016 | Metal | Single | Sep 14, 2017 |
| "Super Freak" | Rick James | 1981 | R&B/Soul/Funk | Single | Sep 21, 2017 |
| "Float" | Switchfoot | 2016 | Alternative | Single | Sep 21, 2017 |
| "Burnin' for You" | Blue Öyster Cult | 1981 | Classic Rock | Single | Sep 28, 2017 |
| "There's Nothing Holdin' Me Back" | Shawn Mendes | 2016 | Pop-Rock | Single | Sep 28, 2017 |
| "Heat of the Moment" | Asia | 1982 | Classic Rock | Single | Oct 5, 2017 |
| "Eye of the Tiger" | Survivor | 1982 | Rock | Single | Oct 5, 2017 |
| "Down in a Hole" | Alice in Chains | 1992 | Grunge | Alice in Chains 03 | Oct 12, 2017 |
| "Man in the Box" | Alice in Chains | 1990 | Grunge | Alice in Chains 03 | Oct 12, 2017 |
| "Them Bones" | Alice in Chains | 1992 | Grunge | Alice in Chains 03 | Oct 12, 2017 |
| "Johnny B. Goode" | Chuck Berry | 1959 | Classic Rock | Single | Oct 26, 2017 |
| "I Want You Back" | The Jackson 5 | 1969 | Pop-Rock | Single | Oct 26, 2017 |
| "Slow Ride" | Foghat | 1975 | Classic Rock | Solid '70s 02 | Nov 2, 2017 |
| "I Wanna Be Sedated" | Ramones | 1978 | Punk | Solid '70s 02 | Nov 2, 2017 |
| "Play That Funky Music" | Wild Cherry | 1976 | R&B/Soul/Funk | Solid '70s 02 | Nov 2, 2017 |
| "Super Beat Sports Big Baos Battle" | Steve Pardo | 2017 | Novelty | Single | Nov 7, 2017 |
| "Bad Reputation" | Joan Jett | 1980 | Punk | Single | Nov 9, 2017 |
| "Blister in the Sun" | Violent Femmes | 1983 | Punk | Single | Nov 9, 2017 |
| "The Sign" | Ace of Base | 1993 | Pop/Dance/Electronic | Back to the '90s 01 | Nov 16, 2017 |
| "Karma Police" | Radiohead | 1997 | Alternative | Back to the '90s 01 | Nov 16, 2017 |
| "Say It Ain't So" | Weezer | 1994 | Alternative | Back to the '90s 01 | Nov 16, 2017 |
| "Hair Trigger" (Note: Song was previously released as part of the Rock Band Network.) | The Acro-Brats | 2010 | Punk | Rock Band 10th Anniversary Pack | Nov 20, 2017 |
| "Collide" | Anarchy Club | 2007 | Metal | Rock Band 10th Anniversary Pack | Nov 20, 2017 |
| "Blood Red Rock" | Bang Camaro | 2008 | Rock | Rock Band 10th Anniversary Pack | Nov 20, 2017 |
| "Shadowbang (Head)" | Bang on a Can All-Stars | 2003 | Other | Rock Band 10th Anniversary Pack | Nov 20, 2017 |
| "Thug Love" | Dance for the Dying | 2011 | Pop-Rock | Rock Band 10th Anniversary Pack | Nov 20, 2017 |
| "Doppelgänger" | Freezepop | 2010 | Pop/Dance/Electronic | Rock Band 10th Anniversary Pack | Nov 20, 2017 |
| "Cheat on the Church" | Graveyard BBQ | 2005 | Metal | Rock Band 10th Anniversary Pack | Nov 20, 2017 |
| "Soy Bomb" | Honest Bob and the Factory-to-Dealer Incentives | 2008 | Indie Rock | Rock Band 10th Anniversary Pack | Nov 20, 2017 |
| "How We'd Look On Paper" | The Main Drag | 2007 | Indie Rock | Rock Band 10th Anniversary Pack | Nov 20, 2017 |
| "Exploited & Exposed" | Symbion Project | 2010 | Pop/Dance/Electronic | Rock Band 10th Anniversary Pack | Nov 20, 2017 |
| "Save a Horse (Ride a Cowboy)" | Big & Rich | 2004 | Country | Single | Nov 21, 2017 |
| "The Middle" | Jimmy Eat World | 2001 | Pop-Rock | Single | Nov 21, 2017 |
| "Twilight of the Thunder God" | Amon Amarth | 2008 | Metal | Single | Nov 30, 2017 |
| "When You Were Young" | The Killers | 2006 | Alternative | Single | Nov 30, 2017 |
| "Run" | Foo Fighters | 2017 | Alternative | Rock the Charts 01 | Dec 7, 2017 |
| "Song #3" | Stone Sour | 2017 | Metal | Rock the Charts 01 | Dec 7, 2017 |
| "The Way You Used to Do" | Queens of the Stone Age | 2017 | Alternative | Rock the Charts 01 | Dec 7, 2017 |
| "Attention" | Charlie Puth | 2017 | Pop-Rock | Off the Charts 06 | Dec 14, 2017 |
| "Sorry Not Sorry" | Demi Lovato | 2017 | Pop/Dance/Electronic | Off the Charts 06 | Dec 14, 2017 |
| "Thunder" | Imagine Dragons | 2017 | Alternative | Off the Charts 06 | Dec 14, 2017 |
| "Feel It Still" | Portugal. The Man | 2017 | Alternative | Off the Charts 06 | Dec 14, 2017 |
| "Suffragette City" | David Bowie | 1972 | Glam | Single | Dec 21, 2017 |
| "Everlong" | Foo Fighters | 1997 | Alternative | Single | Dec 21, 2017 |
| "18 and Life" | Skid Row | 1989 | Glam | Single | Dec 21, 2017 |
| "Plush" | Stone Temple Pilots | 1992 | Alternative | Single | Dec 21, 2017 |
| "Come On Eileen" | Dexys Midnight Runners | 1982 | New Wave | New Year's Eve 2017 | Dec 28, 2017 |
| "Hooked on a Feeling" | Blue Swede | 1974 | Classic Rock | New Year's Eve 2017 | Dec 28, 2017 |
| "The Final Countdown" | Europe | 1986 | Glam | New Year's Eve 2017 | Dec 28, 2017 |
