= Goddamn =

Goddamn or God damn may refer to:

- Damnation
- Goddamn EP, a 1992 EP by You Am I
- "Goddamn", a song by Hellyeah from Hellyeah
- "Goddamn" (MGK song), a song by MGK from Lost Americana
- God Damn (band), an English band
- "God Damn" (song), by Avenged Sevenfold

== See also ==
- Goddam (disambiguation)
