= Mattel (disambiguation) =

Mattel is an American toy and entertainment company.

Mattel may also refer to:

- Mattel, a song in the Avenged Sevenfold album Life Is But a Dream...
- Trixie Mattel, an American drag queen and musician
- Mattel Television, a television production owned by Mattel
- Mattel Films, a film division owned by Mattel
