= Live at the Grammy Museum =

Live album by Avenged Sevenfold
- Released: December 8, 2017
- Recorded: October 19, 2017
- Venue: Grammy Museum (Los Angeles, CA)
- Genre: Acoustic
- Length: 31:12
- Label: Capitol

Avenged Sevenfold chronology
The Best of 2005–2013 (2016)	Live at the Grammy Museum (2017)	Black Reign (2018)

Live at the Grammy Museum is the first live acoustic album by American heavy metal band Avenged Sevenfold, released on December 8, 2017 on Capitol.

== Background ==
After receiving a Grammy nomination for the previous year's release The Stage, the band announced in Fall 2017 that they would be holding "intimate conversation about their career and new music" followed by an unplugged set in the Grammy Museum at the Clive Davis Theater in Los Angeles, taking place on October 19, 2017.

In a statement regarding the event the band said, "We're excited about our Grammy nomination so we're releasing a special acoustic album, 'Avenged Sevenfold Live at the GRAMMY Museum', in the same statement regarding the foundation itself, specifically the proceeds the band continued:

"A portion of the proceeds from this digital-only release will benefit the education initiatives of the GRAMMY Museum, which seek to inspire youth to the enduring qualities and cultural significance of music."

The performance included songs from multiple albums including a cover of The Rolling Stones' "As Tears Go By".

== Track listing ==
No.	Title	Length
1.	"Opening"	1:13
2.	"Introduction to As Tears Go By"	0:13
3.	"As Tears Go By"	3:16
4.	"Introduction to Hail to the King"	0:29
5.	"Hail to the King"	5:52
6.	"Introduction to Roman Sky"	0:22
7.	"Roman Sky"	5:41
8.	"Introduction to Exist"	0:40
9.	"Exist"	5:11
10.	"Introduction to So Far Away"	1:46
11.	"So Far Away"	6:29

== Personnel ==
=== Avenged Sevenfold ===
- M. Shadows – lead vocals
- Zacky Vengeance – rhythm acoustic guitar, backing vocals
- Synyster Gates – lead acoustic guitar, backing vocals, co-lead vocals on "As Tears Go By"
- Johnny Christ – acoustic bass
- Brooks Wackerman – drums

=== Additional musicians ===
- Papa Gates – additional guitars, sitar on "As Tears Go By"
