= Goddam =

Goddam may refer to:

- Adam Goddam (c. 1300–1358), English Franciscan theologian
- Goddam, the parody of Gollum in the book Bored of the Rings
- les goddams, a French ethnic slur for English people

== See also ==
- Godam
- Goddamn (disambiguation)
- Mississippi Goddam, a song written and performed by American singer and pianist Nina Simone
