= Mad Hatter (song) =

Single by Avenged Sevenfold

from the EP Black Reign
- Released: September 17, 2018
- Recorded: March 2018
- Genre: Heavy metal
- Length: 5:04
- Label: Warner Bros.
- Songwriters: M. Shadows; Zacky Vengeance; Synyster Gates; Johnny Christ
- Producer: Joe Barresi

Avenged Sevenfold singles chronology
"Wish You Were Here" (2017)	"Mad Hatter" (2018)	"Set Me Free" (2020)

"Mad Hatter" is a song by American heavy metal band Avenged Sevenfold, released as the lead single from the EP Black Reign on September 17, 2018. It was made specifically for the video game Call of Duty: Black Ops 4 (2018), appearing as an easter egg in the game's "IX" Zombies map. It was the band's first original song since the release of "Dose", a bonus track on The Stage, and the last until "Nobody" in 2023.

== Background ==
With the band having a strong connection with Treyarch, having previously worked on Call of Duty: Black Ops, Call of Duty: Black Ops II and Call of Duty: Black Ops III, they were once again asked to make a song for their 2018 title Call of Duty: Black Ops 4. The band included a sneak peek of the song in their European Tour.

Synyster Gates expressed his excitement of the new song, stating: "We're just about in a state of pure bliss.... We're damn close to getting to exactly where we want to be". M Shadows also commented saying: "The EP is the start of a new era. I'm not sure what that holds for us yet, but we are excited…"

Johnny Christ chimed in: "It's a fun song — it's a little bit of a departure from I think what our fans would expect, but I guess that also makes sense because they expect crazy from us now."

== Recording and musical style ==
The song was recorded in March 2018 in Los Angeles and produced once again by Joe Barresi, before Shadows formed nodes on his vocal chords and couldn't sing for at least a few months.

With Shadows being an avid gamer he was excited about the release being a brand new experience and wanting to write something completely new direction-wise. When asked about the direction of the song he said "We felt that we should take a similar leap with the music and go for something bigger, darker and more cerebral....Watching the initial trailers and looking at production sketches reminded me of the 'S-Town' podcast and its main protagonist, John B. McLemore. Shadows also commented specifically on the lyrics: "I decided that the lyrics would shadow McLemore's life. The result is a thick-grooved song that's dynamic and has a weightiness to it."

A video using "game footage" was released to present the song.

== Release ==
After releasing the song on September 17, the band changed the mix and re-released a new version after fans noticed the song was off and addressed the issue in a Q&A:

"We saw some complaints about the mix and we totally agree with you! We were pushing the limits in a lot of different ways and once the compression of streaming services and radio got a hold of it the clarity become muddied. I heard it on the radio and was like 'Oh Shit!' The good news is we live in a world were you can quickly fix your mistakes and we have done just that."...

M Shadows continued: "I'd put this in the "we fucked up" category," "Mixing and mastering happened while we were in Europe and we were getting stuff sent over and all listening on different headphones. Old mix just pushed it a little far but no one had a set of speakers we trusted being on the road and such. By the time we got home we were used to the sound but hearing it on the radio next to other things allowed us to gain some perspective on it".

== Personnel ==
Personnel adapted from Tidal.

Avenged Sevenfold

- M. Shadows – vocals
- Synyster Gates – lead guitar
- Zacky Vengeance – rhythm guitar
- Johnny Christ – bass
- Brooks Wackerman – drums

Technical personnel

- Joe Barresi – production, recording engineering
- Yosimar Gomez – assistant engineering
- Brian Montgomery – Pro Tools
- Andy Wallace – mixing engineering

== Charts ==
Chart (2018)	Peak position
US Hot Rock & Alternative Songs (Billboard)	28
US Mainstream Rock (Billboard)	9
