= Black Reign (EP) =

EP by Avenged Sevenfold
- Released: September 21, 2018
- Recorded: April 2011; August 2012; November 2015; March 2018
- Genre: Heavy metal
- Length: 21:14
- Label: Warner Bros.
- Producers: Mike Elizondo; Avenged Sevenfold; Joe Barresi

Avenged Sevenfold chronology
Live at the Grammy Museum (2017)	Black Reign (2018)	Life Is But a Dream... (2023)

Singles from Black Reign
- 1. "Mad Hatter" Released: September 17, 2018

Black Reign is the second EP by American heavy metal band Avenged Sevenfold, released on September 21, 2018, through Warner Bros. Records. It is a compilation of all their original songs created for the Call of Duty: Black Ops series from 2011 to 2018.

== Background ==
In September 2018 it was announced the band would release all previous non-album collaborations with the Call of Duty: Black Ops video game series in one collected EP, including a brand new single made specifically for Black Ops 4 as well as "Jade Helm", which was previously only available in-game on Black Ops III.

On September 23, 2018, M. Shadows took to Avenged Sevenfold's Reddit to address the criticism regarding the mixing of "Mad Hatter". He subsequently published a second version to download for free and explained that the song would be replaced on all radio stations and streaming websites.

After the release of this EP, M. Shadows was featured as a playable character in Black Ops 4's "Blackout" gamemode.

== Musical style ==
M. Shadows spoke to Kerrang! about the EP saying "We felt that we should go for something bigger, darker and more cerebral" referring to the brand new song "Mad Hatter". He continued "We have a very deep relationship with the team at Treyarch. We're proud to be part of the family and extremely excited for people to enjoy this next chapter and our contribution to it."

== Track listing ==
All tracks are written by Avenged Sevenfold.

No.	Title	Created for	Length
1.	"Mad Hatter"	Call of Duty: Black Ops 4 (2018)	5:03
2.	"Carry On"	Call of Duty: Black Ops II (2012)	4:15
3.	"Not Ready to Die" (from Call of the Dead)	Call of Duty: Black Ops (2010)	7:05
4.	"Jade Helm" (instrumental)	Call of Duty: Black Ops III (2015)	4:51
Total length:			21:14

== Personnel ==
All credits adapted from Tidal.

Avenged Sevenfold

- M. Shadows – lead vocals
- Synyster Gates – lead guitar, backing vocals
- Zacky Vengeance – rhythm guitar, backing vocals
- Johnny Christ – bass, backing vocals
- Brooks Wackerman – drums on "Mad Hatter" and "Jade Helm"
- Arin Ilejay – drums on "Carry On" and "Not Ready to Die"

Production

- Joe Barresi - production, recording, engineering (track 1)
- Yosimar Gomez - assistant engineering (track 1)
- Andy Wallace - mixing (track 1)
- Brian Montgomery - Pro Tools (track 1)
- Mike Elizondo — production (track 3)
- Adam Hawkins — mixing (track 3)
- Ted Jensen — mastering (track 3)
- Nick Fainburg - mixing, mastering (track 4)

== Charts ==
Chart (2018)	Peak position
US Top Album Sales (Billboard)	80
US Top Current Album Sales (Billboard)	65
US Top Hard Rock Albums (Billboard)	24
