= Bataillon of the Prince of Neuchâtel =

Battalion of the Prince of Neuchâtel
- Bataillon du Prince de Neuchâtel
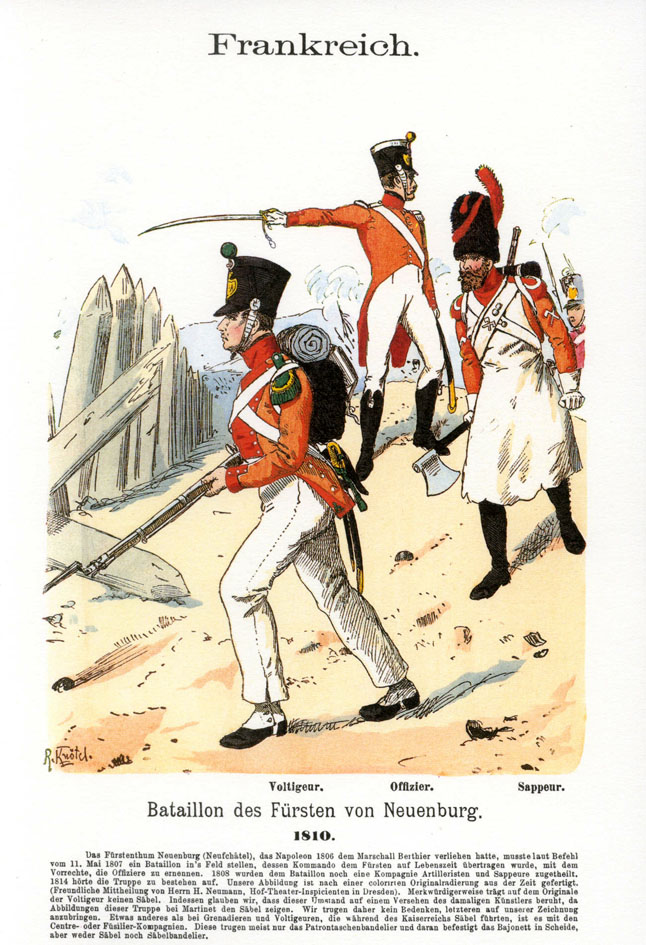
- Uniforms of soldiers of the Bataillon du Prince de Neuchâtel
- Active: 1807 - 1814
- Country: (Canton of Neuchâtel) Principality of Neuchâtel
- Allegiance: France
- Branch: Grande Armée
- Type: Line infantry
- Size: Regiment
- Depot: Besançon
- Engagements: Napoleonic Wars

The Bataillon of the Prince of Neuchâtel (French: Bataillon du Prince de Neuchâtel), also known as the Bataillon of Neuchâtel (French: Bataillon de Neuchâtel), is a foreign line infantry regiment of the Grande Armée.

== History ==
On 26 February 1806, having defeated the Russians and Austrians at the end of the War of the Third Coalition, Napoleon signed an alliance treaty with Prussia. Faced with the recent victor in the Battle of Austerlitz, King Frederick William III was forced to cede his possessions of Cleves and Neuchâtel to France. Neuchâtel was occupied on 19 March by the troops of General Oudinot, and a few days later, on 22 March, the principality officially came under French control.

On 11 May 1807, Napoleon issued, from the Château de Finckenstein, the decree creating the Battalion of the Prince of Neuchâtel. Article 4 stated that:

"The Battalion of the Prince of Neuchâtel shall consist of six companies: one company of grenadiers, one company of voltigeurs (light infantry), and four line companies."

Each company was theoretically composed of 3 officers, 6 non-commissioned officers, 2 drummers, and 140 corporals and enlisted men, for a total strength of 160 men. A small battalion staff of 8 personnel consisting of the battalion commander, a recruiting lieutenant, an adjutant major, a surgeon, a drum major, and three craftsmen brought the official strength to 648 men. Including two drummer boys (children attached to the regiment) per company, the total establishment reached 660 men.

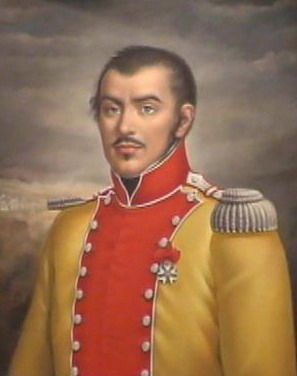
Jean-Henri de Bosset

Command of the battalion was entrusted to Captain Jean-Henri de Bosset, a Swiss officer in French service. He was assigned by Marshal Louis-Alexandre Berthier to organize and recruit the battalion. As specified by the decree, recruits were accepted only from Neuchâtel, the Swiss cantons, or the Valais.

On 27 August 1808, Napoleon added an artillery company of 83 men to the battalion. It was equipped with two 6-pounder cannons, along with their caissons and ammunition wagons.

The battalion's depot is established at Besançon. In 1807, there are only 216 men out of the 660 expected. The six companies are nonetheless formed to fulfill the emperor's wishes, but their numbers are extremely reduced. At the end of December, the battalion is brought up to 479 men including officers. Although necessary for the instruction of mostly inexperienced recruits, their training is quickly rushed through.

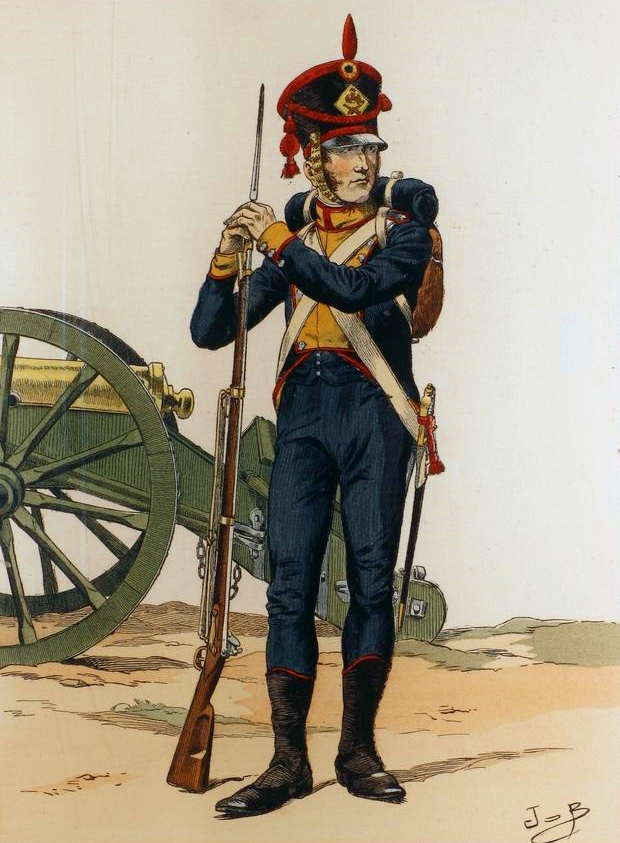
Artilleryman of the Neuchâtel battalion.

It was not until 1809 and the Second Austrian campaign that the Neuchâtelois distinguished themselves on a battlefield at the Battle of Wagram. Placed at the disposal of the emperor's headquarters, the battalion secured the protection of the Grande Armée's lines of communication. On the first day of the Battle of Wagram, it was tasked with guarding one of the bridges over the Danube alongside a contingent from Baden. While the French troops were temporarily driven back and recrossed the river in disorder, the Neuchâtel battalion held out against the attack of the Austrian battalions, which were rushing forward. Oddly, no losses were reported during the battle.

The battalion participated in fighting in Spain from 1810 to 1811. On October 15, 1810, it was transferred to General Claparède's division in Valladolid. Under Marshal Michel Ney, it then took part in the Siege of Ciudad Rodrigo. In 1811, it was in Salamanca under General Thiébault. The battalion returned to Besançon on June 15, 1812.

The battalion fought in Russia and Germany before being disbanded in 1814.
