= Life Is But a Dream... =

- Standard edition cover art by Wes Lang. The digital release does not include the band's name and album title.

Studio album by Avenged Sevenfold
- Released: June 2, 2023
- Recorded: 2018–2022
- Studios: Henson (Los Angeles); Costa Mesa Sound (Costa Mesa); Joe's House of Compression (Pasadena); Sony Scoring Stage (Culver City)
- Genres: Avant-garde metal; progressive metal
- Length: 53:21
- Label: Warner
- Producers: Avenged Sevenfold; Joe Barresi

Avenged Sevenfold chronology
Black Reign (2018)	Life Is But a Dream... (2023)	Statica (2026)

Singles from Life Is But a Dream...
- 1. "Nobody" Released: March 14, 2023; 2. "We Love You" Released: May 12, 2023; 3. "Mattel" Released: September 21, 2023

Life Is But a Dream... is the eighth studio album by American heavy metal band Avenged Sevenfold, released on June 2, 2023, through Warner Records. Its release follows nearly seven years after its predecessor, The Stage (2016), marking the band's longest gap between studio albums to date. It is also the first album to feature contributions from their late drummer Jimmy "The Rev" Sullivan since Nightmare (2010). Similar to The Stage, Life Is But a Dream... was produced by the band with Joe Barresi. It marked the band's return to Warner following a legal dispute between the band and Warner Music in the mid-2010s.

Life Is But a Dream... received critical acclaim from music critics for its themes, experimental approach, and blend of influences and genres. The album peaked at 13 on the Billboard 200, which was the band's lowest since City of Evil (2005).

== Background and recording ==
Writing and recording for Life Is But a Dream... commenced in 2018 and was completed in 2022. Recording took place at Henson Recording Studios in Los Angeles, producer Joe Barresi's House of Compression studio in Pasadena, California, and Costa Mesa Recording Studios in Costa Mesa, California. The band had finished recording much of the album's material by the end of 2020, though the COVID-19 pandemic prolonged the album's recording stage, primarily due to concerns about traveling. The band also expressed dissatisfaction towards the idea of releasing the album without being able to promote it with a tour.

Lead vocalist M. Shadows claimed the album was 70 percent complete in February 2021, with items such as mixing and recording orchestral sections still needing to be done. The band recorded with 78-piece San Bernardino Symphony orchestra at the Sony Scoring Stage in Culver City, California. The recording of the orchestral sections was completed in February 2022, with drummer Brooks Wackerman touting on social media that the album was now 90 percent complete. Andy Wallace, the band's longtime mixer, finished mixing the album in September 2022, with Wackerman stating on social media that the album would now be ready for release in 2023.

== Composition ==
Musically, Life Is But a Dream... has been described as avant-garde metal, and progressive metal. Lyrically, the album was inspired by the writing and philosophy of Albert Camus, with existentialism and absurdism being two major themes throughout the album. Camus' 1942 novella The Stranger was particularly influential on the lyrics for songs like "Nobody". Shadows and guitarist Synyster Gates created a demo for "Nobody" after being inspired by a painting, also titled "Nobody", created by Wes Lang, who later led the art direction and created the cover art for Life Is But a Dream... M. Shadows has also stated about the band's direction that the album's music was greatly inspired by electronic music and hip hop. Shadows and Gates were also largely inspired by their experiences with psychedelic drugs, particularly 5-MeO-DMT.

== Promotion and release ==
Avenged Sevenfold began teasing new material in February 2023 with an online scavenger hunt that began with their social media accounts being supposedly hacked, claiming that certain upcoming appearances at music festivals were canceled. The scavenger hunt was centered around a Reddit user named "Libad5343", the suspected hacker of the band's social media accounts, and their blog, which included articles written with ChatGPT and images generated by DALL-E 2. Eventually, one of the clues featured coordinates leading to The Ritz, a music venue in San Jose, California, which had "Libad5343 Presents Nobody" written on its signage, with a hidden phrase instructing people to meet at the venue at midnight on March 6, 2023.

Upon the scavenger hunt being completed, fans were rewarded with an unlisted YouTube video that had a countdown set for 8 a.m. PT on March 14. Soon after, the band confirmed the legitimacy of the countdown video. The lead single, "Nobody", was released on March 14, accompanied by a stop motion music video directed by Chris Hopewell. On the same day, the band also revealed the details for Life Is But a Dream..., including its release date and cover art, which was designed by Wes Lang.

The album's second single, "We Love You", was released on May 12. Three weeks before the album's release, certain fans were able to hear the album early at an "immersive" paid listening event. The event took place at Area15 in Las Vegas, from May 11 to May 14, 2023. The band announced on May 11 that they would also play a surprise concert, their first in 5 years, at Area15 the next day. The concert featured the live debut of the two singles, as well as album opener "Game Over".

Life Is But a Dream... was released on June 2, 2023, through Warner Records in both digital and physical formats. It is the band's first studio album to be released through Warner since Hail to the King (2013), as they released The Stage (2016) through Capitol Records following a legal battle with Warner Music. Life Is But a Dream... includes 11 different color variations for its vinyl release, most of which are exclusive to a respective retailer.

== Critical reception ==
Professional ratings
Aggregate scores
Source	Rating
Metacritic	87/100
Review scores
Source	Rating
AllMusic	4/5 stars
Blabbermouth.net	8.5/10
Classic Rock	4.5/5 stars
Distorted Sound	6/10
Ghost Cult	9/10
Hysteria Mag	9/10
Kerrang!	4/5 stars
Metal Hammer	4.5/5 stars
Sputnikmusic	4.5/5
Wall of Sound	7/10

Life Is But a Dream... received critical acclaim. At Metacritic, which assigns a normalized rating out of 100 to reviews from mainstream publications, the album received an average score of 87, based on four reviews, indicating "universal acclaim".

Sam Law of Kerrang! praised the album's diversity in styles and musical elements as well as its adventurous nature, writing, "In the process of shedding any lingering preconceptions about genre, consistency and the basic rules of songwriting, [Avenged Sevenfold] haven't just made an album that's more out-there than any they've put their name to before – they've delivered a set of songs that are simply far more fun." Merlin Alderslade of Classic Rock wrote, "With Life Is But a Dream..., Avenged Sevenfold haven't just transcended their metal peers for good, they've also created their definitive artistic statement," describing it as "bloody fantastic".

Simon K. of Sputnikmusic praised the album, noting that the music was very different from mainstream rock and metal, and a bold departure from the band's usual style. He wrote, "Ultimately, Life is But a Dream.. is the real deal. Avenged [Sevenfold] didn't come up with a half-baked idea here and got cold feet halfway through its development, they see this through to the end. This will piss people off, there's no doubt about that, but I think it's an album that will be looked on very fondly in ten years' time."

In June 2023, Alternative Press published an unranked list of the top 25 albums of the year to date and included this release, calling it "an experimental record that leaned into the unpredictability of pushing boundaries and bending genres".

=== Accolades ===
Accolades for Life Is But a Dream...
Publication	List	Rank
Alternative Press (United States)	50 best albums of 2023	–
Classic Rock	The 50 Best Rock albums of 2023	21
Kerrang! (United Kingdom)	The 50 Best Albums of 2023	6
Loudwire (United States)	The 25 Best Rock + Metal Albums of 2023	–
Loudersound (United States)	The 50 best rock albums of 2023	21
Metal Injection	Metal Injection's Top 20 Albums Of 2023	9
Metal Hammer	The 50 best metal albums of 2023	7
Revolver	30 best albums of 2023	4
Rock Sound (United Kingdom)	Top 50 Albums of 2023	6
Rolling Stone	The 11 Best Metal Albums of 2023	7

== Track listing ==
All tracks are written by Zachary Baker, Brian Haner Jr., Matthew Sanders, Jonathan Seward, and Brooks Wackerman, except where noted

Life Is But a Dream... track listing
No.	Title	Writer(s)	Length
1.	"Game Over"		3:46
2.	"Mattel"	Baker; Haner; Sanders; Seward; James Sullivan; Wackerman	5:30
3.	"Nobody"		5:53
4.	"We Love You"		6:15
5.	"Cosmic"		7:31
6.	"Beautiful Morning"	Baker; Haner; Sanders; Seward; Sullivan; Wackerman	6:32
7.	"Easier"		3:37
8.	"G"		3:37
9.	"(O)rdinary"		2:52
10.	"(D)eath"		3:19
11.	"Life Is But a Dream..."	Haner	4:29
Total length:			53:21

== Personnel ==
Avenged Sevenfold

- M. Shadows – lead vocals (1–10)
- Zacky Vengeance – rhythm guitar, backing vocals (1–10)
- Synyster Gates – lead guitar (1–10), piano (1–3, 5, 6, 8, 9, 11), Mellotron (1, 6), flute (1), Rhodes piano (2, 5, 10), Wurlitzer organ (2), synthesizers (6, 7, 10), Hammond organ, harmonica (6), lead vocals (6)
- Johnny Christ – bass (1–10)
- Brooks Wackerman – drums (1–10)

Additional musicians

- San Bernardino Symphony – orchestra
- Anthony Parnther – orchestra conductor
- Noah Gladstone – orchestra contractor
- Jason Freese – synthesizer (3–5, 8–10)
- Brianna Mazzola – background vocals (8)
- Taura Stinson – background vocals (8)
- The Rev – bridge melody (2), lyrics (6)

Additional personnel

- Avenged Sevenfold – production, orchestration
- Joe Barresi – production, engineering (all tracks); additional mixing (1, 2, 5–7, 10)
- Andy Wallace – mixing
- Dan Malsch – mixing
- Bob Ludwig – mastering
- Adam Michalak – orchestral recording
- Jun Murakawa – additional recording
- Nick Fainbarg – additional recording
- Brian Rajaratnam – recording assistance
- Bruce Jacoby – drum technician
- Wes Lang – cover art
- Ines Velasco – orchestral transcriptions
- Marc VanGool – guitar technician

== Charts ==
=== Weekly charts ===
Weekly chart performance for Life Is But a Dream...
Chart (2023)	Peak position
Australian Albums (ARIA)	46
Austrian Albums (Ö3 Austria)	22
Belgian Albums (Ultratop Flanders)	89
Belgian Albums (Ultratop Wallonia)	81
Canadian Albums (Billboard)	11
Croatian Albums (HDU)	19
Dutch Albums (Album Top 100)	61
Finnish Albums (Suomen virallinen lista)	20
French Albums (SNEP)	54
German Albums (Offizielle Top 100)	27
Hungarian Albums (MAHASZ)	4
Italian Albums (FIMI)	77
Japanese Albums (Oricon)	46
Japanese Hot Albums (Billboard Japan)	43
Japanese Rock Albums (Oricon)	10
New Zealand Albums (RMNZ)	29
Polish Albums (ZPAV)	33
Portuguese Albums (AFP)	10
Scottish Albums (Official Charts)	11
Spanish Albums (Promusicae)	50
Swedish Physical Albums (Sverigetopplistan)	18
Swiss Albums (Schweizer Hitparade)	36
Swiss Albums (Romandie)	10
UK Albums (Official Charts)	21
UK Rock & Metal Albums (Official Charts)	3
US Billboard 200	13
US Top Album Sales (Billboard)	5
US Top Alternative Albums (Billboard)	2
US Top Hard Rock Albums (Billboard)	2
US Top Rock Albums (Billboard)	3

=== Year-end charts ===
Year-end chart performance for Life Is But a Dream...
Chart (2023)	Position
US Top Current Album Sales (Billboard)	100
US Top Rock & Alternative Albums (Billboard)	95
US Top Hard Rock Albums (Billboard)	41
