= Grande Armée slang =

Army slang

As with all armed forces throughout history, the French Grande Armée of the Napoleonic Wars used a colorful and extensive vocabulary of slang terms to describe their lives, times and circumstances and express their reactions towards them.

This is a partial glossary article meant to supplement the articles on La Grande Armée and Military slang. Providing such information can greatly help the reader to understand and appreciate the lives of these soldiers. There are also a few terms included from the later Armée du Nord included here for the sake of interest and completeness.

== A ==
Abbaye-de-Sot-Bougre (Abbey of drunks)
the camp prison

un abreuvoir à mouches (fly's drinking trough)
a deep gash in one's face

L'Arme Blanche (The White Weapon)
1) a cutting or thrusting weapon (such as a sword or lance) rather than gunpowder weapons like firearms or cannon. 2) The cavalry, especially hussars and lancers.

Les autres chiens (the other dogs, pun for autrichiens, French for Austrians)
Austrians

Avoir de la garnison (having a garrison)
to have lice

Avoir des engelures aux yeux (having frostbitten eyes)
to be afraid during an attack

avoir sa pente (to have one's slope)
to be a drinker.

== B ==
la bamboche (lit. the marionette, fig. debauchery)
The Legion of Honour.

un beau sabreur (a fine swashbuckler)
a Hussar.

la bouffarde (the puffer)
a short-stemmed pipe.

briscard (from brisque, insignia of a rehired soldier)
a veteran campaigner. From the inverted chevron worn on the upper sleeve to indicate their veteran status.

brise-muraille (wall-breaker, or fort-breaker)
artilleryman

le brutal (the brutal one)
Artillery.

un bulletin (bulletin/report)
a liar

== C ==
Les Carabins (Sawbones)
Surgeons.

Le Casse-Poitrine (Gut Breaker)
Strong drink.

Les Céleris (Celery Eaters)
Commissary officers.

Le Chapeau (The Hat)
Napoleon Bonaparte.

La charmante (the charming [woman])
mange/scabies

Le Cheval Brutal (Brutal Horse)
Horse artillery.

La Côte de Boeuf (Rib of Ox)
A sabre.

Les Cousins de l'Empereur (The Emperor's cousins)
Corsicans.

Un Crâne (Skull, referring to the brain within)
An experienced campaigner.

Le Crucifix à Ressort (Springed Crucifix)
A pistol.

Le Coucou (Cuckoo)
A French eagle.

Le cul-de-singe (monkey's arse)
the round, red, insignia patch on a grenadier's bearskin cap

Les Cupidons (little Cupids)
Russian Bashkir archers

== D ==
La Débine
Poverty.

Défiler en Parade (March Off)
To die in battle.

Déjeuner à la fourchette (lunch on a fork, or eating lunch with a fork)
a bayonet attack

Descendre la Garde (Drop One's Guard)
To die in battle.

Dur à cuire (lit. "hard to cook", tough guy)
An experienced campaigner.

Dur Cormant (Hardwood)
Beef.

== E ==
eaux-de-vie (water of life)
gin or brandy; alcoholic drink, sold by Vivandières.

embrassé par une demoiselle (kissed by a young lady)
wounded by a cannonball

être mis aux mites (put in with the moths)
Jailed.

être abîmé (being damaged)
To be wounded.

== F ==
Faire une Bosse (To make a Bump)
Eat well.

La Fête (The Party)
War.

La flûte a gros bec (the big-mouthed flute)
Artillery

Un Frileux (One who is sensitive to cold)
A frightened soldier.

Friser (To Graze)
A near miss.

== G ==
Génies (génie has many French definitions -- Genie, wizard, genius, engineer)
Military engineers

Gilets de Fer (Steel Vests)
Cuirassiers.

un gigot (a leg [as in leg of lamb])
an ugly or botched amputation

Les Goddams (the "god damns")
British infantry.

Les Grands Chapeaux (The Big Hats)
Napoleon and his Marshals

Les Grognards (The Grumblers/Growlers)
Imperial Old Guards.

Gros Talons (Big Heels)
Grenadiers à Cheval of the Imperial Guard, also "les Géants" (the Giants) or "les Dieux" (the Gods.)

== H ==
Heureux comme un poisson sur la paille (as happy as a fish in the hay)
to be depressed

Hypothèque (Mortgage)
Be wounded.

== I ==
Les Immortels (Immortals)
Imperial Guardsmen.

== J ==
Le Jus de l'Arbre (Sap of the Tree)
Wine.

== K ==
Les Kaiserlicks (from kaiserlich, "Imperial")
Austrian infantry.

== L ==
Lampion (Chinese Lantern)
Napoleon Bonaparte's cocked hat. Derived from the similar sounding "L'Empereur".

== M ==
Marchand de mort subite (merchant of sudden-death)
the Master-at-Arms

Marche à Regret (Unwilling walker/marcher)
Conscript.

Marche à Terre (Walks on land, or land-walker)
Foot slogger.

marcher à la queue au loup (marching holding the wolf's tail)
a night march (soldiers would hold onto the coattails of the soldier in front)

Marie-Louise
Enthusiastic but inexperienced conscript of the 1813-15 drafts.

Mettre les Dents au Crochet (Set One's Teeth on Edge)
To be starving.

Mettre sa vaisselle à l'air (airing one's crockery)
Wearing (showing-off) one's medals

La Mie de Pain (Breadcrumbs)
Fleas.

Le mois de Napoléon (Napoleon's month)
the thirteenth month of one's tour

Les Musikos
Brothels.

La Musique (The Music)
War.

== N ==
La Noce (The Wedding)
War.

== O ==
L'oiseau (The Bird)
A French eagle.

On Déchire de la Mousseline (They Are Ripping Muslin)
A Volley of Fire (by poorly drilled troops).

== P ==
Le Patron (The Boss)
Napoleon Bonaparte.

peint à l'encaustique (painted with furniture polish)
an inexperienced hussar (they would draw moustaches on them)

Le Petit Caporal (Little (humble) Corporal)
Napoleon Bonaparte.

Le Petit Tondu (Little Shaved/Mowed One)
Napoleon Bonaparte.

Les Pékins (The Muftis)
Civilians.

Piler du Poivre (Grind Peppercorns)
Sentry duty.

pousse-caillou (pebble-pusher)
infantryman

Pousser la botte au cochon (to kick [lit. push one's boot against] the pig)
running one's sword through somebody's throat

== R ==
Une Rafale (A gust)
A frightened soldier.

Le raisin (Grape)
Blood.

Riz-Pain-Sel (Rice, Bread, Salt)
Commissary officers.

Le Rogomme (Booze)
Strong drink.

Les Rosbifs (The Roastbeefs)
Englishmen or English soldiers. From their traditional ration of salted beef.

== S ==
Les sans-culottes (the no-britches)
Radical left-wing partisans of the lower classes. They wore worker's pantaloons and socks rather than gentlemen's breeches and hose.

Les Sauterelles (Grasshoppers)
British riflemen, who wore green uniforms rather than the red uniforms issued to common British infantry.

Le Sauve-la-Vie (Life Saver)
Strong drink.

la savate (the old boot)
an informal punishment where a soldier who had committed an infraction against his fellows was forcibly bent over and then kicked in the buttocks by his squadmates. Typical charges were for concealing small valuables or loot, badly preparing the squad's meal, straggling on the march, or arriving too late on the battlefield. Victims were sentenced to either the "thin" or the "fat" of the boot depending on the severity of the infraction. Using the "thin" part was kicking with the sole or side of the toe (which was less painful) and using the "fat" part was stomping the target with the heel of the boot (which was more painful).

Se faire laver les cheveux avec du plomb (to have one's hair washed with lead)
to be executed by firing squad.

Les soldats à la crème (soldiers served with cream)
Austrian troops (because of their white uniforms).

== T ==
Teufels ('Devils')
Prussian infantry.

Le Tondu ('The Shorn One')
Napoleon

Tourner de l'oeil (Roll One's Eyes/Faint)
To die.

Trouver (To Find)
To steal.

le trottoir à punaises (the bedbugs' sidewalk)
the ornamental fringe on a shako visor

== V ==
Vieille Moustache (Old moustache)
Veteran campaigner.

Vieille culotte (old pants)
A veteran

Vrai Bougre (True fellow)
Veteran campaigner.
