= God Damn (song) =

Single by Avenged Sevenfold

from the album The Stage
- Released: March 21, 2017
- Recorded: 2016
- Length: 3:41
- Label: Capitol
- Songwriter: Avenged Sevenfold
- Producers: Avenged Sevenfold; Joe Barresi

Avenged Sevenfold singles chronology
| "The Stage" (2016) | "God Damn" (2017) | "Mad Hatter" (2018) |

"God Damn" is a song by American heavy metal band Avenged Sevenfold. It was released on March 21, 2017, as the second single from their seventh studio album, The Stage. It is the shortest track on the album, coming in at 3:41. The song introduces a heavier sound to the album.

== Music video ==
On February 1, 2017, the band posted a picture on their social media which stated that they were casting for fans to appear in a new music video (later revealed to be God Damn). Fans were chosen via e-mail submissions and were required to wear black clothing for the video. The video was filmed on February 8, and was released on April 26. The clip shows a live performance of the band playing the song, and it ends with glitch effects taking over the video. It was directed by Anders Rostad.

== Personnel ==
All credits adapted from Tidal, except where noted.

=== Avenged Sevenfold ===
- M. Shadows – lead vocals
- Zacky Vengeance – rhythm guitar, backing vocals
- Synyster Gates – lead guitar, backing vocals
- Johnny Christ – bass, backing vocals
- Brooks Wackerman – drums

=== Session musicians ===
- Brian Kilgore – percussion

=== Production ===
- Joe Barresi and Avenged Sevenfold – production
- Andy Wallace – mixing
- Bob Ludwig – mastering
- Paul Suarez – mixing engineer
- Ignacio Lecumberri – assistant mixing engineer
- Josh Wilbur – assistant mixing engineer
- Nick Fainbarg – technical engineer

== Charts ==
| Chart (2017) | Peak position | | |
|---|---|---|---|
| US Hot Rock & Alternative Songs (Billboard) | 37 | US Mainstream Rock (Billboard) | 9 |
