= Not Ready to Die =

Single by Avenged Sevenfold

from the EP Black Reign
- Released: May 2, 2011
- Recorded: April 2011
- Genre: Heavy metal
- Length: 7:05 (single version); 6:08 (radio edit)
- Label: Warner Bros.
- Songwriters: M. Shadows; Synyster Gates; Zacky Vengeance; Johnny Christ; Kevin Sherwood
- Producer: Mike Elizondo

Avenged Sevenfold singles chronology
| "So Far Away" (2011) | "Not Ready to Die" (2011) | "Buried Alive" (2011) |

"Not Ready to Die" is a song by American heavy metal band Avenged Sevenfold. It was created specifically for the video game Call of Duty: Black Ops (2010), appearing as an easter egg in the game's "Call of the Dead" Zombies map. The song, along with the 3 other originals the band wrote for the Black Ops series, was later released on the Black Reign EP in 2018.

== Background ==
"Not Ready to Die" was written for map "Call of the Dead" from the zombies gamemode in Call of Duty: Black Ops. The lyrics of the song are based on the story and lore of the game, which singer M. Shadows is a big fan of. This song would mark the first collaboration between Avenged Sevenfold and the Black Ops franchise, with the band contributing 5 more songs to the series. The bridge of the song features an interpolation of "Damned", the Black Ops Zombies theme song.

The song was written in four days between the band's Nightmare After Christmas and Welcome to the Family tours, and was recorded in April 2011.

== Personnel ==
Credits adapted from Tidal.

Avenged Sevenfold

- M Shadows – lead vocals
- Zacky Vengeance – rhythm guitar, vocals
- Synyster Gates – lead guitar, backing vocals
- Johnny Christ – bass guitar, backing vocals

Additional musicians

- Arin Ilejay – drums

Production

- Mike Elizondo – production
- Adam Hawkins – mixing engineer
- Ted Jensen – mastering engineer

== Charts ==
| Chart (2011) | Peak position |
|---|---|
| Canada Hot 100 (Billboard) | 73 |
| UK Rock & Metal (Official Charts) | 1 |
| US Billboard Hot 100 | 70 |
