= Nobody (Avenged Sevenfold song) =

Single by Avenged Sevenfold

from the album Life Is But a Dream...
- Released: March 14, 2023
- Recorded: 2020–2022
- Genre: Progressive metal
- Length: 5:53
- Label: Warner
- Songwriters: Zachary Baker; Brian Haner Jr.; Matthew Sanders; Jonathan Seward; Brooks Wackerman
- Producers: Avenged Sevenfold; Joe Barresi

Avenged Sevenfold singles chronology
"Mad Hatter" (2018)	"Nobody" (2023)	"We Love You" (2023)

"Nobody" is a song by American heavy metal band Avenged Sevenfold. It was released on March 14, 2023, as the lead single from their eighth studio album, Life Is But a Dream.... It is the band's first new song since the release of "Mad Hatter" in 2018. The song was debuted live on May 12, 2023, at a surprise show in Las Vegas.

== Promotion and release ==
The release of "Nobody" was preceded by a countdown video on YouTube set for its release at 8 a.m. PT on March 14, 2023. The countdown video was unlocked by fans after completing an online scavenger hunt created by the band in order to tease new material. The release of "Nobody" coincided with the announcement of Life Is But a Dream..., its corresponding album. "Nobody" was accompanied by a music video, which was uploaded to YouTube the same day as the single release, where it amassed over 500,000 views in the first 24 hours and rising No. 1 on trending videos on YouTube. The video was directed by Chris Hopewell, and is entirely in stop motion.

Band vocalist M. Shadows "trolled" media outlets by sharing the lyrics of the band's song "Girl I Know" from Diamonds in the Rough and saying they were from an early demo of "Nobody". Music news outlets first reported this as fact, before quickly realizing they were tricked. The actual lyrics of the song are inspired by the writings of the French philosopher Albert Camus.

== Personnel ==
Credits adapted from Tidal, except where noted.

Avenged Sevenfold

- M. Shadows – lead vocals
- Zacky Vengeance – rhythm guitar, backing vocals
- Synyster Gates – lead guitar, backing vocals, piano
- Johnny Christ – bass, backing vocals
- Brooks Wackerman – drums

Additional musicians

- Jason Freese – synthesizers
- San Bernardino Symphony – orchestra
- Noah Gladstone – orchestra conductor

Additional personnel

- Joe Barresi – production, engineering
- Andy Wallace – mixing
- Dan Malsch – mixing
- Bob Ludwig – mastering
- Adam Michalak – orchestral recording
- Jun Murakawa – additional recording
- Nick Fainbarg – additional recording
- Brian Rajartnam – recording assistant
- Bruce Jacoby – drum technician
- Wes Lang – cover art
- Ines Velasco – copier

== Charts ==
=== Weekly charts ===
Weekly chart performance for "Nobody"
Chart (2023)	Peak position
US Hot Rock & Alternative Songs (Billboard)	28
US Rock & Alternative Airplay (Billboard)	5

=== Year-end charts ===
Year-end chart performance for "Nobody"
Chart (2023)	Position
US Rock Airplay (Billboard)	20
