= Circles (Pierce the Veil song) =

Single by Pierce the Veil

from the album Misadventures
- Released: April 27, 2016
- Recorded: 2015
- Genre: Pop-punk
- Length: 3:44
- Label: Fearless
- Songwriters: Vic Fuentes; Curtis Peoples
- Producer: Dan Korneff

Pierce the Veil singles chronology
"Texas Is Forever" (2016)	"Circles" (2016)	"Pass the Nirvana" (2022)

"Circles" is a song by American rock band Pierce the Veil. It was released as the third streaming single from the group's fourth full-length studio album, Misadventures, on April 27, 2016. It was co-written by frontman Vic Fuentes and Curtis Peoples and was produced by Dan Korneff.

== Background ==
Following Pierce the Veil's extensive touring in support of their third studio album, Collide with the Sky (2012), the band wrote and recorded material for a fourth studio album throughout the later half of 2014 with producer Dan Korneff. The band announced their fourth studio album, Misadventures, on March 18, 2016, releasing the album's second single "Texas Is Forever" on the same day. Prior to "Texas Is Forever", the album's lead single "The Divine Zero" was released for digital download on June 18, 2015. On April 27, 2016, the band released "Circles" as the third single from Misadventures. Vic Fuentes has said that the song is about the November 2015 Paris attacks.

== Release ==
On April 27, 2016, the band released "Circles" whilst on a short European tour in promotion for their fourth studio album, Misadventures. The single was released via digital download, streaming, and radio airplay. It first premiered on Annie Mac's radio show on BBC Radio 1 the same day. "Circles" was released to radio on May 25, 2016.

== Music video ==
On June 6, 2016, Alternative Press revealed that Pierce the Veil had shot footage for a music video for "Circles" in Los Angeles, California and featured television and music personality Matt Pinfield.

The video shows the band about to spend the night at a hotel only for them to realize that the hotel isn't what they thought to be. Eventually the hotel manager begins to chase the band around and the band ends up in a room showing newspaper clippings of other bands who have gone missing, they then are able to escape. However a day later during breakfast the band are watching the news with the news reporter interviewing the hotel manager who reveals to have the bands ID cards and thus their home addresses. The band are then shocked by the reveal.

== Charts ==
Upon its release, "Circles" peaked and debuted at No. 37 on the Billboard Twitter Real-Time chart. In the United States, "Circles" also charted at No. 32 on the Hot Rock Songs chart. and No. 11 on the Spotify Velocity chart,

Chart (2016)	Peak position
US Hot Rock & Alternative Songs (Billboard)	32
US Alternative Airplay (Billboard)	31

== Certifications ==
Certifications for "Circles"
Region	Certification	Certified units/sales
United States (RIAA)	Gold	500,000^{‡}
^{‡} Sales+streaming figures based on certification alone.

== Personnel ==
Pierce the Veil

- Vic Fuentes – vocals, rhythm guitar
- Tony Perry – lead guitar
- Jaime Preciado – bass
- Mike Fuentes – drums, percussion

Production

- Dan Korneff – production

== Release history ==
Country	Date	Format
United States	April 27, 2016	Digital download
