= Dragon's breath (ammunition) =

Incendiary-effect round for shotguns

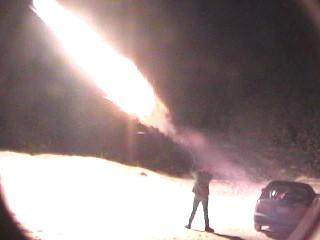
A Dragon's breath round being fired at night

Dragon's breath is a special type of incendiary-effect round for shotguns. Dragon's breath consists primarily of magnesium pellets/shards. When the round is fired, sparks and flames can shoot out to about 100 feet (30 meters), although some sources claim it extends to 300 feet (91 meters). Dragon's breath is normally chambered in 12-gauge 2 3/4-inch (18.5 mm × 69.9 mm) shot shells. The rounds are safe to fire out of an improved cylinder bore as well as a modified-choke barrel, common on many shotguns.

== Overview ==
While its combat or tactical usage remains undocumented, the visual effect it produces is impressive and entertaining, similar to that of a short-ranged flamethrower or fireworks. The safety aspects of the ammunition are disputed, as the magnesium shards burn at approximately 3,000 to 4,000 °F (1,650 to 2,200 °C).

== Legality ==
The sale of dragon's breath rounds is illegal in several US states (Alaska, California, Washington D.C, Florida, Hawaii, Illinois, Massachusetts, New Jersey, Maryland, and New York) and shipping may be restricted in other locations and cities due to their inherent fire hazard. Dragon's breath ammunition is alleged to have been the cause of a 2024 wildfire in Ocean County, New Jersey.

== See also ==
- Tracer ammunition
