= The Stage (song) =

Single by Avenged Sevenfold

from the album The Stage
- Released: October 13, 2016
- Recorded: 2016
- Genre: Progressive metal
- Length: 8:32
- Label: Capitol
- Songwriter: Avenged Sevenfold
- Producers: Avenged Sevenfold; Joe Barresi

Avenged Sevenfold singles chronology
| "Shepherd of Fire" (2013) | "The Stage" (2016) | "God Damn" (2017) |

"The Stage" is a song by American heavy metal band Avenged Sevenfold. It was released on October 13, 2016, as the first single from their studio album of the same name. The song was nominated at the 60th Annual Grammy Awards for the "Best Rock Song" category.

"The Stage" is featured in the video game Rock Band 4's "More Metal Pack 01" downloadable content.

== Music video ==
The official music video was released to YouTube on October 13, 2016. The video shows a puppet show depicting humans throughout history killing each other. In the present day, it portrays politicians as puppets manipulating the crowd. At the end, a reaper-like figure is shown pulling the strings of the politicians and pressing a "reset button," returning the scene to the beginning of mankind.

== Accolades ==
| Publication | Accolade | Year | Rank |
|---|---|---|---|
| Loudwire | 20 Best Metal Songs of 2016 | 2016 | 14 |
| Loudwire | 10 Best Metal Videos of 2016 | 2016 | 3 |
| Revolver Magazine | 30 Best Songs of 2016 | 2016 | 4 |

== Personnel ==
Avenged Sevenfold

- M. Shadows – lead vocals
- Zacky Vengeance – rhythm guitar, backing vocals
- Synyster Gates – lead guitar, backing vocals, classical guitar
- Johnny Christ – bass, backing vocals
- Brooks Wackerman – drums

Additional musician

- Jason Freese – keyboards

== Charts ==
Chart performance for "The Stage"
| Chart (2016) | Peak position |
|---|---|
| Scotland (OCC) | 83 |
| UK Singles Sales (OCC) | 78 |
| UK Singles Downloads (OCC) | 77 |
| UK Rock & Metal (OCC) | 7 |
| US Bubbling Under Hot 100 (Billboard) | 7 |
| US Digital Song Sales (Billboard) | 41 |
| US Hot Rock & Alternative Songs (Billboard) | 10 |
| US Rock & Alternative Airplay (Billboard) | 24 |
| US Mainstream Rock (Billboard) | 4 |
