= Call of Duty: Black Ops =

2010 video game

- Developer: Treyarch (Note: Ported to Nintendo DS by n-Space, and to OS X by Aspyr. Ported to PlayStation 4 and PlayStation 5 by Iron Galaxy.)
- Publisher: Activision
- Directors: Dave Anthony; Corky Lehmkuhl
- Producer: Pat Dwyer
- Designers: David Vonderhaar; Jimmy Zielinski
- Artist: Colin Whitney
- Writers: Craig Houston; Dave Anthony
- Composer: Sean Murray
- Series: Call of Duty
- Engine: IW 3.0 (modified)
- Platforms: PlayStation 3; Windows; Nintendo DS; Wii; Xbox 360; OS X; PlayStation 4; PlayStation 5
- Release: November 9, 2010: PS3, Win, DS, Wii, X360; November 9, 2010; OS X; September 27, 2012; PS4, PS5; July 9, 2026
- Genre: First-person shooter
- Modes: Single-player, multiplayer

Call of Duty: Black Ops is a 2010 first-person shooter game developed by Treyarch and published by Activision. It was released worldwide in November 2010 for Microsoft Windows, the PlayStation 3, Wii, and Xbox 360, with a separate version for Nintendo DS developed by n-Space. Aspyr later ported the game to Mac OS X in September 2012. Ports for the PlayStation 4 and PlayStation 5, developed by Iron Galaxy Studios, were released on July 9, 2026. It is the seventh title in the Call of Duty series and a sequel to Call of Duty: World at War.

Set in the 1960s during the Cold War, the game's single-player campaign follows CIA operative Alex Mason as he attempts to recall specific memories to locate a numbers station set to instruct Soviet sleeper agents to deploy chemical weapons across the United States. Locations featured in the game include Cuba, the Soviet Union, the United States, South Vietnam, Hong Kong, Canada, and Laos. The multiplayer component of Black Ops features multiple objective-based game modes that are playable on 14 different maps included with the game. Improvements to loadout options and killstreak rewards are made. A form of virtual currency, COD Points, allows players to purchase weapons and customization options for their in-game character, as well as attachments and customization options for their weapon.

Development for the game began in 2009. Whereas Treyarch worked on both World at War and the tie-in video game for the James Bond film Quantum of Solace simultaneously, they focused specifically on Black Ops during this development cycle. Different teams within Treyarch focused on a certain game mode. Black Ops runs an enhanced version of the IW 3.0 engine used in World at War. The improvements made allowed for bigger campaign levels to be made as well as enhanced lighting. Music was composed by Sean Murray, with licensed music by the Rolling Stones, Creedence Clearwater Revival, and Eminem appearing in the game. Avenged Sevenfold also recorded an original song for the game as well. The marketing of the game began in April 2010.

The game received positive reviews from critics with praise for its story, voice-acting, darker tone and multiplayer modes, although some criticized it for its linear gameplay and technical issues. It is retrospectively considered one of the series' best games. Among other awards and nominations, Call of Duty: Black Ops was nominated for Game of the Year by numerous media outlets and award shows, including the Interactive Achievement Awards, British Academy Games Awards, and Spike Video Game Awards. Within 24 hours of going on sale, the game had sold more than 5.6 million copies, breaking the record set by its predecessor Modern Warfare 2 by some 2.3 million copies. The game had sold over 25 million copies worldwide, making it, at the time, the best selling game of all time in the United States, and it remains one of the best-selling games of all time. A sequel, Call of Duty: Black Ops II, was released in 2012. Call of Duty: Black Ops Cold War, set between Black Ops and Black Ops II, was released in 2020.

== Gameplay ==
Black Ops is a first-person shooter, retaining the same gameplay mechanics as previous Call of Duty titles. The player assumes the role of a foot soldier who can wield various firearms (only two of which can be carried at once), throw grenades and other explosives, and use other equipment as weapons. A player close enough to an enemy can kill with one knife blow. A character can take three stances: standing, crouching, or prone. Each affects the rate of movement, accuracy, and stealth. The player can drop to the prone stance from the standing stance while running (colloquially known as "dolphin diving"), and can momentarily sprint before stopping.

The screen glows red to indicate damage to a player's health, which regenerates over time. When the character is within the blast radius of a live grenade, an on-screen marker indicates where it is in relation to the player character, helping the player to decide whether to move away or to throw it back. Among the weapons new to the series in Black Ops are crossbows that shoot typical bolts or explosive ammunition, and a kind of shotgun that fires Dragon's Breath rounds and ballistic knives.

A screenshot of Alex Mason firing a Dragon's Breath round from a SPAS-12 shotgun

The player assumes the role of various characters during the single-player campaign, changing perspectives throughout the story. The playable characters are covert operatives conducting black operations behind enemy lines. Each mission features a series of objectives that are displayed on the heads-up display, which marks the direction and distance towards and from such objectives as it has been in the earlier versions. The player is accompanied by friendly troops throughout the game. Although the game is primarily a first-person shooter, certain levels feature sequences where the player pilots a Hind helicopter and guides friendly troops from a SR-71 Blackbird reconnaissance aircraft. In addition, the campaign features several scripted cinematic moments.

=== Multiplayer ===
Players can customize their weaponry in the game, as seen with this customized FAMAS.

The online multiplayer gameplay of Black Ops consists of one of several styles of team-based action, depending on the chosen game mode. For example, in Team Deathmatch the team with the most kills wins, while in Capture the flag, players take the other team's flag and return it to their base. Additionally, there is Free For All in which players are not separated into teams. There were 14 multiplayer maps available to play at the game's release and further ones were released over time as downloadable content.

Black Ops retains the experience points and unlockable reward system that has been kept since Call of Duty 4. The multiplayer focuses on socialization and customization. The "Create-a-Class 2.0" system allows enhanced personalization with appearance items as well as upgradable perks; weapons are extensively customizable with writing, emblems, attachments, and camouflage painting. Even reticles can be modified.

Weapons can be personalized with a number of attachments, allowing for extensive customization; for example, the player can choose between a red dot sight or a reflex sight, both of which share many of the same traits, although the red dot fills up less of the screen (something desired by many players). Character models depend on the chosen first tier perk instead of the weapon's type, as was the case in World at War. Furthermore, face paints can be unlocked. New custom killstreak rewards include explosive R/C cars, guided missiles, and controllable attack helicopters.

A currency system has been implemented allowing players to buy weapons, as well as cosmetics, accessories and clothes. Players can gamble with their "COD Points" in a free-for-all based playlist called "Wager Match", which is composed of four game modes. Time-limited objectives known as "Contracts" can be purchased to gain more currency and experience points. The progression system is not featured in the local split-screen multiplayer. In the local split-screen play, all character customization options are already unlocked. Players can no longer define game rules such as win conditions.

Players can play alone or with friends against AI opponents in "Combat Training" with a separate progression system. Online split-screen is re-introduced on Xbox 360 and PS3. The guest account can rank up but is reset after each sign out. Only on Xbox 360, a second Gold Xbox Live account can be used to keep the second player's progression. Aside from the Combat Training mode, Xbox users can also have up to four players in split-screen mode play against AI opponents even without having an Xbox Live account. This is done by configuring the Local Split Screen settings and setting the number of enemies to a value greater than zero.

For the first time in the series, clips from online gameplay can be recorded. Some specific features that have been removed from the PC version of Infinity Ward's Modern Warfare 2 return, such as the ability to lean around corners. mod tools, the developer console, and dedicated servers. Dedicated servers are exclusively provided by Game Servers. Steam is the exclusive platform for Black Ops on PC, and the game is protected by Valve Anti-Cheat.

The Wii version of the game includes in-game voice chat. This is the first Call of Duty title to include the voice chat feature for the Wii. Nintendo and PDP have partnered to release the first headset to be used with the Wii known as PDP's Headbanger Headset.

=== Zombies ===
A zombie-themed survival co-op mode, titled “Zombies”, can be played with four players online or as a two-player split screen co-op mode. Originally featured in World at War, it was revamped to be included in Black Ops and future titles. The Zombies mode takes place over various eras of time, mainly during the final year of World War II and the 1960s. The story mostly follows a crew of four soldiers: "Tank" Dempsey of the United States Marine Corps, Nikolai Belinski of the Red Army, Takeo Masaki of the Imperial Japanese Army, and Doctor Edward Richtofen of the Wehrmacht.

In this mode, one to four players fight an unlimited number of waves of zombies, beginning with an M1911 pistol as their only weapon. Players earn points for killing zombies or repairing barricades in boarded-up windows, which are used to expand areas of the map, access stronger weapons, or upgrade existing weapons. Zombies routinely break the windows to enter and attack the players; if a player is attacked enough times, they fall and will need to be "revived" by another player in a certain time, or will respawn in the next round with their weapon progress reverted if they are not revived. The game ends when all players are damaged enough to fall. The base game features three maps, "Five", "Kino Der Toten", and the unlockable "Dead Ops Arcade".

Dead Ops Arcade is an unlockable game mode that the player can unlock by typing "DOA" within the data terminal of the main menu. Once unlocked, the player can start a game of a retro, twin-stick shooter-styled arcade version of the main Zombies game mode. New elements like extra lives, unique mini maps, and zombie bosses are present within the game mode. Dead Ops Arcade includes co-op playthrough through either Xbox Live or split screen of up to four players.

== Synopsis ==
=== Campaign ===
The game's narrative mostly details Mason's recollection of events in an interrogation room prior to February 1968. This summary is in chronological order.

From left to right: Alex Mason, Jason Hudson, and Robert McNamara (Robert Picardo)

In April 1961, CIA operatives Alex Mason (Sam Worthington), Frank Woods (James C. Burns), and Joseph Bowman (Ice Cube) join Operation 40, to assist Cuban exiles during the Bay of Pigs invasion and assassinate Fidel Castro. Mason kills Fidel Castro's body double and is forced to stay behind so Woods and Bowman can escape before being captured by Cuban forces. The real Castro hands Mason over to Soviet Army Major General Nikita Dragovich (Eamon Hunt). Imprisoned in the brutal gulag Vorkuta, Mason befriends ex-Red Army soldier Viktor Reznov (Gary Oldman), who recounts his origin backstory with Dragovich, Colonel Lev Kravchenko (Andrew Divoff), and ex-Nazi scientist Friedrich Steiner (Mark Bramhall). In October 1945, Reznov and his comrade Dimitri Petrenko recover Steiner and his chemical weapon "Nova 6" from a Nazi outpost on Baffin Island under Dragovich and Kravchenko's orders. However, Dragovich betrays them, wishing to see the effects of Nova 6. Reznov watches Dimitri die horrifically, only to escape when British Commandos, interested in acquiring Nova 6, assault their position. Reznov personally destroys the weapon, but is captured and sent to Vorkuta.

In October 1963, Mason and Reznov spark an uprising, but Reznov stays behind, allowing Mason to escape. In November, Mason returns to the U.S., and is debriefed by his handler, Jason Hudson (Ed Harris), and attends a meeting at the Pentagon, where U.S. President John F. Kennedy (Chriss Anglin) orders Mason to assassinate Dragovich; Mason is plagued by anxiety and murderous visions during the meeting. Mason's team is deployed to Baikonur Cosmodrome, where they rescue fellow operative Grigori Weaver (Gene Farber). Afterward, they destroy the Soyuz spacecraft and eliminate scientists working for the Ascension group. Mason seemingly kills Dragovich in a car explosion; however, he doubts his presumed death and spends the next five years tracking him down.

In January 1968, Mason's team is deployed to Vietnam as part of MACV-SOG. After defending Khe Sanh from a North Vietnamese assault, the team infiltrates Hue City in February, during the Tet Offensive, to extract a Soviet defector, revealed to be Reznov. After confirming Kravchenko's presence in the Vietnamese jungle, the team infiltrates Laos to recover a shipment of Nova 6 from a downed Soviet plane, but is captured by Viet Cong and Spetznaz forces led by Dragovich at the crash site. Bowman is executed during a forced game of Russian roulette, but Mason and Woods escape and pilot a Mi-24 Hind to Kravchenko's base, reuniting with Reznov. Woods stabs Kravchenko, but he primes grenades on his belt, forcing Woods to push them both out a window; the two are presumed dead.

Meanwhile, Hudson and Weaver interrogate Daniel Clarke (Gary Oldman), a British scientist who helped the Soviets recreate Nova 6, in Kowloon Walled City. Clarke reveals the location of Dragovich's facility on Mount Yamantau, before being killed by Dragovich's men. Hudson and Weaver infiltrate and destroy the facility, but not before receiving a transmission from Steiner, who requests that they extract him from Rebirth Island in the Aral Sea, as he suspects Dragovich will silence him. Mason and Reznov also head to Rebirth Island, assassinating Steiner just as Hudson and Weaver arrive. Although Mason supposedly witnessed Reznov executing Steiner, Hudson and Weaver saw Mason committing the act while calling himself Reznov. With Steiner dead, Mason is the only one who can decode the location of Dragovich's numbers station. Hudson and Weaver subdue Mason and bring him in for interrogation.

In February 1968, after Mason attempts to escape from his interrogation, Hudson subdues him and explains that Dragovich has sleeper cells who will deploy Nova 6 across America, following a series of numbers broadcast from his station. Dragovich brainwashed Mason in Vorkuta to assassinate Kennedy, but Reznov reprogrammed him to kill Dragovich, Kravchenko, and Steiner as revenge. In reality, Reznov died during the breakout, and Mason's visions of him are hallucinations caused by the brainwashing, altering his identity. Mason remembers that the station is located on a ship called the Rusalka in the Gulf of Mexico. After Mason, Hudson, and Weaver lead an assault on the ship, the former two infiltrate Dragovich's underwater submarine base directly below on the seabed. Mason shuts down the numbers broadcast and kills Dragovich before he and Hudson escape back to the surface, with Weaver declaring victory. In the aftermath, footage from Kennedy's assassination shows Mason was present at Dallas Love Field, suggesting that Mason may have carried out his initial programming.

=== Zombies ===
No.	Title	Original release date
1	"Kino der Toten"	November 9, 2010
Following their battle against the zombie horde in the Der Riese weapons factory, (Note: As depicted in Call of Duty: World at War (2008)) the crew – Doctor Edward Richtofen (Nolan North), "Tank" Dempsey (Steve Blum), Nikolai Belinski (Fred Tatasciore), and Takeo Masaki (Tom Kane) — overloads the teleporter and travels forward in time to an abandoned Nazi movie theatre in 1960s Berlin, where the German research organization Group 935 set up a secret facility. The crew continues their battle against the undead while exploring the theatre's secrets.
2	"Five"	November 9, 2010
In the aftermath of the Cuban Missile Crisis, President John F. Kennedy (Jim Meskimen) holds a meeting in the Pentagon with Robert McNamara (Robert Picardo), Fidel Castro (Marlon Correa), and Richard Nixon (Dave Mallow) to conduct negotiations. A zombie outbreak at the Pentagon forces the four political figures to take up arms and defend themselves.
3	"Ascension"	February 1, 2011
Using a lunar lander, the crew travels to a Soviet Cosmodrome, where a second zombie outbreak occurs simultaneously with the one in the Pentagon. There, the crew encounters the scientist Doctor Gersh (Nolan North), who is stuck in an ethereal form. Following his instructions, the crew helps free Gersh from the grasp of Samantha Maxis (Julie Nathanson), a young girl who gained powers over the undead horde and is actively hunting Richtofen and his associates.
4	"Call of the Dead"	May 3, 2011
In the modern day, director George A. Romero is producing the film Call of the Dead at a former Group 935 outpost in Siberia, when he is kidnapped by a zombie and turned into an undead himself. The film's main cast members – Sarah Michelle Gellar, Michael Rooker, Robert Englund, and Danny Trejo – are forced to battle Romero and the undead horde. While exploring the film set, the actors encounter the crew, who were mistakenly teleported into an enclosed room and are instructed by Richtofen to acquire a "Vril device" for him. Afterward, the crew teleports to another destination, leaving the actors to fend for themselves.
5	"Shangri-La"	June 28, 2011
The crew arrives at the mystical city of Shangri-La, where they encounter two explorers named Brock and Gary, who are trapped in a time loop. By altering the environments to facilitate their path, the crew helps Brock and Gary open a hidden temple, revealing Richtofen's next objective, an artifact called the "Focusing Stone". The crew teleports away once more, leaving the explorers trapped in the loop.
6	"Moon"	August 23, 2011
The crew travels to Area 51, before using the base's teleporter to head to the Moon, where a Group 935 research facility is located. The facility houses the "Moon Pyramid Device" (MPD), which contains Samantha in stasis. It is revealed that, in an accident, Samantha was trapped in the MPD. After witnessing her father, Doctor Ludvig Maxis (Fred Tatasciore), kill himself, Samantha swore vengeance on all Group 935 members and unleashed the zombies upon them across time and space. Using the Vril device and the Focusing Stone, Richtofen swaps souls with Samantha, allowing him to become the new zombie controller, while leaving Samantha trapped in Richtofen's body. Maxis, whose spirit now resides in the Moon base as a sentient artificial intelligence, contacts the crew and instructs them to sever Richtofen's connection to the "Aether" dimension by sending several rockets toward Earth, destroying it in the process, but leaving Richtofen in control of the undead.

== Development ==
In May 2009, publisher Activision was rumored to be looking for licensing regarding Vietnam War-era music which led to speculation that Call of Duty 7 would be set in Vietnam. In November 2009, only a few days before Modern Warfare 2's release, Activision officially announced a new Call of Duty title for 2010 through their third quarter financial call. In February 2010, a casting call for Call of Duty 7 led to speculation that the game would be taking place during the Cold War era with some battles taking place in South Vietnam. On April 30, 2010, Black Ops was officially announced.

The game runs on an enhanced World at War engine (which itself was improved from Call of Duty 4's) at 60 frames per second across all platforms, excluding the Wii. It features a streaming texture technology (also seen in Modern Warfare 2), making bigger levels possible such as "Payback" where the player controls a helicopter. Lighting effects have been improved as well. Call of Duty: Black Ops supports 3-D imaging rendered by the engine itself. This feature is available on the PC, PlayStation 3, and Xbox 360 versions.

For Black Ops, Treyarch focused only on this game unlike past practice. However, it had different teams, each working on separate game modes. Treyarch used a motion capture technology similar to the one used in James Cameron's film Avatar, which allows accurate facial expressions, capturing the whole performance of the actor. The studio also consulted special forces veterans from both belligerents of the Cold War: Major John Plaster (US Army-Ret.) who served in the MACV-SOG during the Vietnam War, and former Soviet special forces operative Sonny Puzikas. The latter taught Treyarch how Spetsnaz soldiers would react in combat, such as rolling out of the line of fire. Spetsnaz AIs in the game have been modeled after him, from his tactics and his movements to his face. Although having a historical background, the classified aspect of these Cold War black operations allowed the studio to create its own fictional story. The game also allows players to turn down the blood and turn off the profanity.

It was announced on November 9, 2015, that Black Ops would become backward compatible with the Xbox One. It was originally meant to be available for backward compatibility in December 2015, but the date was later changed to some time in 2016. Black Ops was originally the sixth-most requested Xbox 360 title to become backward compatible with the Xbox One. On May 17, 2016, the game was made available through Xbox One's backward compatibility. Shortly after, it was reported that sales of the Xbox 360 version had increased by 13,000 percent. In May 2026, entries for Black Ops and Black Ops II appeared on the website for the Game Rating and Administration Committee, which sparked speculation on remasters of both titles for modern consoles. The following month, Treyarch confirmed in a social media post that Iron Galaxy Studios worked on the ports, which would be exclusive to PlayStation 4 and PlayStation 5 and would release in July. The ports were released on July 9, 2026.

=== Audio ===
Black Ops features the voices of Sam Worthington as Alex Mason and Ed Harris as Jason Hudson. Gary Oldman reprises his role as Viktor Reznov from World at War and also voices Dr. Clarke. James C. Burns voices and provides performance capture for Frank Woods. Ice Cube voices Joseph Bowman, and is also the multiplayer announcer for the SOG faction. Gene Farber voices Grigori Weaver, Emmanuelle Chriqui plays a live-action character called Numbers, Eamon Hunt voices Nikita Dragovich, Andrew Divoff voices Lev Kravchenko and Robert Picardo voices Secretary Robert McNamara. Dimitri Diatchenko, an American born actor and musician voices the Spetsnaz faction and several other characters due to his strong Russian accent.

Call of Duty: Black Ops features Vietnam War era music including "Sympathy for the Devil" by the Rolling Stones (played during a gameplay sequence, the credits, and as an easter egg in the multiplayer map Nuketown) and Creedence Clearwater Revival's "Fortunate Son". Eminem's "Won't Back Down" (featuring Pink) is used for the credits as well, and additionally appears as an Easter Egg in the Zombie map "Five". In the Call of the Dead zombie map the song "Not Ready to Die" by American heavy metal band Avenged Sevenfold is featured as an easter egg. The original music was composed by Sean Murray, who also composed Call of Duty: World at War while Kevin Sherwood composed music for the Zombies mode. The soundtrack was released on November 9. The use of the Rolling Stones' music in the game has seen a significant increase in the band's music sales since launch. "Gimme Shelter" sold 2,000 copies in the week before the launch trailer was revealed, 5,000 the week after, and 11,000 the week after the game's release. "Sympathy for the Devil" experienced a similar boost as gamers discovered the band's music.

The game's score was composed by Sean Murray, and the official soundtrack was released on November 9, 2010. A second soundtrack, containing music from the games Zombies mode, was released on January 25, 2011.

== Marketing ==
Black Ops was first revealed when the games official website went live on April 30, 2010, with a teaser trailer premiering on GameTrailers TV Episode 310. In early April 2010, an unmarked envelope was sent to various gaming news publications as well as high-profile Call of Duty fans via mail. It contained a USB flash drive with sound and text files. These files were codes to be decrypted, only to find a mysterious teaser site for an unknown game. Other codes were updated periodically.

Similarly to Modern Warfare 2's marketing, the first full-length trailer of Black Ops was aired after the 3rd quarter on ESPN during the NBA Eastern Conference Finals on May 18, 2010. During E3 2010, studio head Mark Lamia opened the Microsoft conference by playing Black Ops on stage. It was also announced that the timed Xbox 360 exclusivity for additional content of Call of Duty titles, which began with Modern Warfare 2, extends until 2012. A remixed version of the ESPN trailer with Eminem's "Won't Back Down" was released on June 14, prior to the E3 Activision conference for which he also performed. A multiplayer teaser trailer was released on August 9, 2010, revealing killstreaks, weapons, and other in-game multiplayer features. A full multiplayer reveal took place on September 1, 2010, and revealed many multiplayer features from the game.

Chrysler produced a limited-edition Call of Duty Jeep as the Wrangler is featured in Black Ops. In late September, viral site GKNOVA6 was updated revealing fuzzy footages of zombies. On October 11, a single player trailer aired on ESPN during the New York Jets versus Minnesota Vikings NFL Monday Night Football game. The same trailer was aired the next day in the United Kingdom at half time of the England versus Montenegro 2012 European Football Championship qualifying game. On October 29, the official launch trailer was released online. The same trailer aired on October 31 during the New Orleans Saints versus Pittsburgh Steelers NFL Sunday Night Football game. The trailer features the song "Gimme Shelter" by the Rolling Stones, and was directed by Rupert Sanders, who later went on to direct Snow White and the Huntsman and Ghost in the Shell.

=== Retail versions ===
Like Modern Warfare 2, "Hardened" and "Prestige" limited editions are available: the Hardened Edition includes a SteelBook case, a medal with its display case, four exclusive co-op levels and an Xbox Live or PlayStation Home avatar outfit. The Prestige Edition offers, in addition to the Hardened Edition's content, a real RC-XD remote-control vehicle modeled after the in-game killstreak reward, which gives video and audio feedback to its controller. In Japan, the game is distributed by Square Enix. Two versions are available: subtitled or dubbed, released respectively on November 18, 2010, and December 16, 2010. Both have dismemberment censored. Gore is censored as well in Germany in addition to the removal of "Sympathy for the Devil" and Nazi symbols considered "anti-constitutional" in the country.

Black Ops was also released for both mobile phones and smartphones. This version is a side-scrolling shooter. It features a different storyline, a different set of characters, and is set in the Vietnam War in 1967. The game was developed by Glu Mobile and published by Activision.

=== Downloadable content ===
Treyarch released the "First Strike" Map Pack on February 1, 2011, for the Xbox 360. The PlayStation 3 received the map pack on March 3, 2011, and the PC version was released on March 25, 2011, through Steam. The Map Pack includes additional maps that can be played in the multiplayer mode. These maps include "Berlin Wall", "Discovery", "Kowloon" and "Stadium" and a map for the Zombies mode titled "Ascension" which takes place in a Soviet launch site.

On April 11, 2011, a second map pack called "Escalation" was announced by Activison and Microsoft. It features 4 new multiplayer maps named "Zoo", "Hotel", "Convoy", "Stockpile" and one new zombies map named 'Call of the Dead'. This map is based on the movies by George A. Romero, the revolutionary epic-zombie-horror director. The trailer for this map shows the four playable characters: Danny Trejo, Sarah Michelle Gellar, Robert Englund and Michael Rooker. The name is a reference to the immensely popular Dead Series created and directed by Romero. The trailer also offers a sneak peek of a zombiefied version of George A. Romero himself, lurking out of water. The map is set on a ship, but with the ship's crew as zombies instead of Nazi zombies. It was released on May 3, 2011, for the Xbox 360, June 2 on the PC and June 10 for the PlayStation 3.

A third map pack called "Annihilation" was released for the Xbox 360 on June 28, 2011, and on July 28, 2011, for the PlayStation 3 and PC. It contains four new multiplayer maps named "Hangar 18", "Hazard", "Drive-In", "Silo", and a new zombies map named "Shangri La", which takes place in a legendary shrine lost in an exotic jungle.

The fourth map pack, "Rezurrection" was released on August 23, 2011, for the Xbox 360, and September 22, 2011, on PlayStation 3 and PC. The Rezurrection Map Pack is made up of 5 Zombies mode only maps. It includes the first 4 maps from Call of Duty: World at War ("Nacht Der Untoten"/"Night", "Verruckt"/"Asylum", "Shi No Numa"/"Swamp", "Der Riese"/"Factory") fully remastered. It also includes a new map called "Moon". "Moon" allows players to fight zombies in zero gravity with both the player and the zombies under zero gravity influence.

== Reception ==
Reception

Aggregate score
Aggregator	Score
Metacritic	DS: 74/100; PC: 81/100; PS3: 88/100; WII: 80/100; X360: 87/100

Review scores
Publication	Score
1Up.com	A−
Destructoid	6/10
Edge	7/10
Eurogamer	8/10
Famitsu	39/40
Game Informer	9/10
GamePro	5/5
GameSpot	9/10
GameSpy	4/5
GamesRadar+	9/10
GameTrailers	9.3/10
Giant Bomb	4/5
IGN	8.5/10; WII: 7.5/10
Official Xbox Magazine (UK)	9/10
Official Xbox Magazine (US)	9.5/10
PC Gamer (UK)	64/100
The Guardian	5/5
VideoGamer.com	6/10
X-Play	5/5
The Escapist	3/5
The Daily Telegraph	10/10

Call of Duty: Black Ops received "generally positive" reviews, according to review aggregator website Metacritic, except for the DS, where it received "mixed or average" reviews. GameSpot awarded it 9.0 out of ten and wrote "Call of Duty: Black Ops bears the series' standard superbly, delivering an engrossing campaign and exciting competitive multiplayer." Edge was less positive, giving it a 7/10, writing that "As polished and pretty and fun as Black Ops often is, it feels more like a yearly update than a sequel [which] isn't distinct from its predecessors in any important way". Several reviewers also complained that the game felt too much like a rail shooter, with PC Gamer branding it "barely interactive".

Reviewers also noted that the PC version of the game was buggy and had "a number of frustrating problems", including a lag in multiplayer modes which for some players rendered the game almost "unplayable". Players have also reported serious bugs with the PlayStation 3 version, including compatibility issues with 3D televisions. PC World magazine noted that user reviews of the game were much less positive than those of critics. As of November 12, 2010, three days after the release, PC, PS3, and Xbox 360 versions of the game held average user ratings of 3.1, 3.1, and 1.8 stars on Amazon.com, respectively (on a 1 to 5 scale), with many PC users complaining about lag, stuttering and bugs.

In January 2011, to a player complaining about the remaining connection problems for the game on PlayStation 3, an Activision customer service representative threatened that they could shut down the servers for the game for the PlayStation Network at any time. After some days and following some game media heat, Dan Amrich, Activision Social Media Manager, declared that even if they could kill the servers, they did not plan currently to do it.

The Daily Telegraph praised Black Ops as its "meaty kick of the guns, the blistering pace of the action and the sterling soundtrack of explosions, gunshots and whistling bullets all serve to quicken the player's pulse and tighten their grip on the controller", and how the game is "compensated for by [the] nail-shredding tension and creepy atmosphere".

Official Nintendo Magazine awarded the Wii version 90% and said "Black Ops on Wii is a fantastic shooter packed with all the features of its HD brothers, with the only exception being split-screen multiplayer." Martin Gaston at VideoGamer.com gave the Wii version 6 out of 10, complaining of Treyarch's reworking of in-game sequences as movies, poor AI, and gameplay problems from lower-resolution graphics.

In February 2011, the Xbox 360 version was named the Xbox Live's top title of 2010, by GameSpot.

At the 14th Annual Interactive Achievement Awards (now known as the D.I.C.E. Awards), Call of Duty: Black Ops was nominated for "Game of the Year", "Action Game of the Year", "Outstanding Achievement in Animation", "Outstanding Achievement in Online Gameplay", and "Outstanding Achievement in Visual Engineering".

=== Sales ===
Within 24 hours of its release, Black Ops had sold 4.2 million copies in the U.S. and 1.4 million copies in the UK, surpassing that of Modern Warfare 2 and establishing a new record for largest entertainment launch. Compared to the much anticipated opening of Harry Potter and the Deathly Hallows – Part 1, the game earned more than twice as much as the film, earning $360 million. Only five days after its release, sales from the game worldwide reached US$650 million, surpassing the previous record achieved by Modern Warfare 2 which earned $550 million in five days. By November 22, the game remained the bestselling title in the United Kingdom, despite sales dropping by 85%. Some estimates had placed sales of the game as reaching 18 million units sold, earning a revenue of $818 million. This would fall about 2 million copies and $182 million short of Modern Warfare 2. By December 22, worldwide revenue of Black Ops exceeded $1 billion. Sales remained strong months after the game's release, remaining at the top-seller list in February 2011. On March 3, 2011, the news magazine The Hollywood Reporter also reported on the best selling video games ever. It announced that Call of Duty: Black Ops was the best-selling game ever in the United States of America. Black Ops was the best-selling game of all time in the UK until Grand Theft Auto V overtook it in November 2014. In August 2011, Activision announced that the game had sold more than 25 million copies. By November 2013, the game had sold 26.2 million copies.

=== Controversy ===
Cuba has condemned the game for its depiction of American special forces trying but failing to kill a young Fidel Castro, killing instead a body-double. The Cuba-based pro-Fidel Castro website Cubadebate said the game "encourages sociopathic attitudes of American children and adolescents, the main consumers of these virtual games."

=== Retrospective reviews ===
Retrospective assessments rank Call of Duty: Black Ops among the series' best installments, and it remains one of the series' most popular titles and a fan-favorite. Many called the game an improvement over World at War and believed Treyarch established itself as a premier Call of Duty studio with the title, stepping out of Infinity Ward's shadow. Reviewers have praised the campaign as one of the series' best, highlighting its Cold War setting and cast of characters. Writers of Digital Trends particularly highlighted the vocal performances from Sam Worthington and Gary Oldman. Sam Loveridge of GamesRadar+ called it Treyarch's best game in the series.

The game's multiplayer mode introduced features that became mainstays in the series, including more customization and cosmetic options, CoD Points, dolphin diving, wager matches, and modes such as One in the Chamber and Gun Game. NME's staff wrote that the "exceptional" multiplayer "[took] what made Modern Warfare work and lacquer[ed] it with Cold War-era cool". The game also saw the introduction of fan-favorite maps such as Firing Range and Nuketown, the latter being re-released in every subsequent Treyarch game in the series. The Zombies mode also received praise for being innovative, introducing larger maps, Easter Eggs, additional gameplay opportunities, and a retro arcade version of the mode. Despite its praise, some reviewers believed Black Ops did not reinvent the Call of Duty formula as significantly as previous entries.
