= Les goddams =

Obsolete French ethnic slur for the English

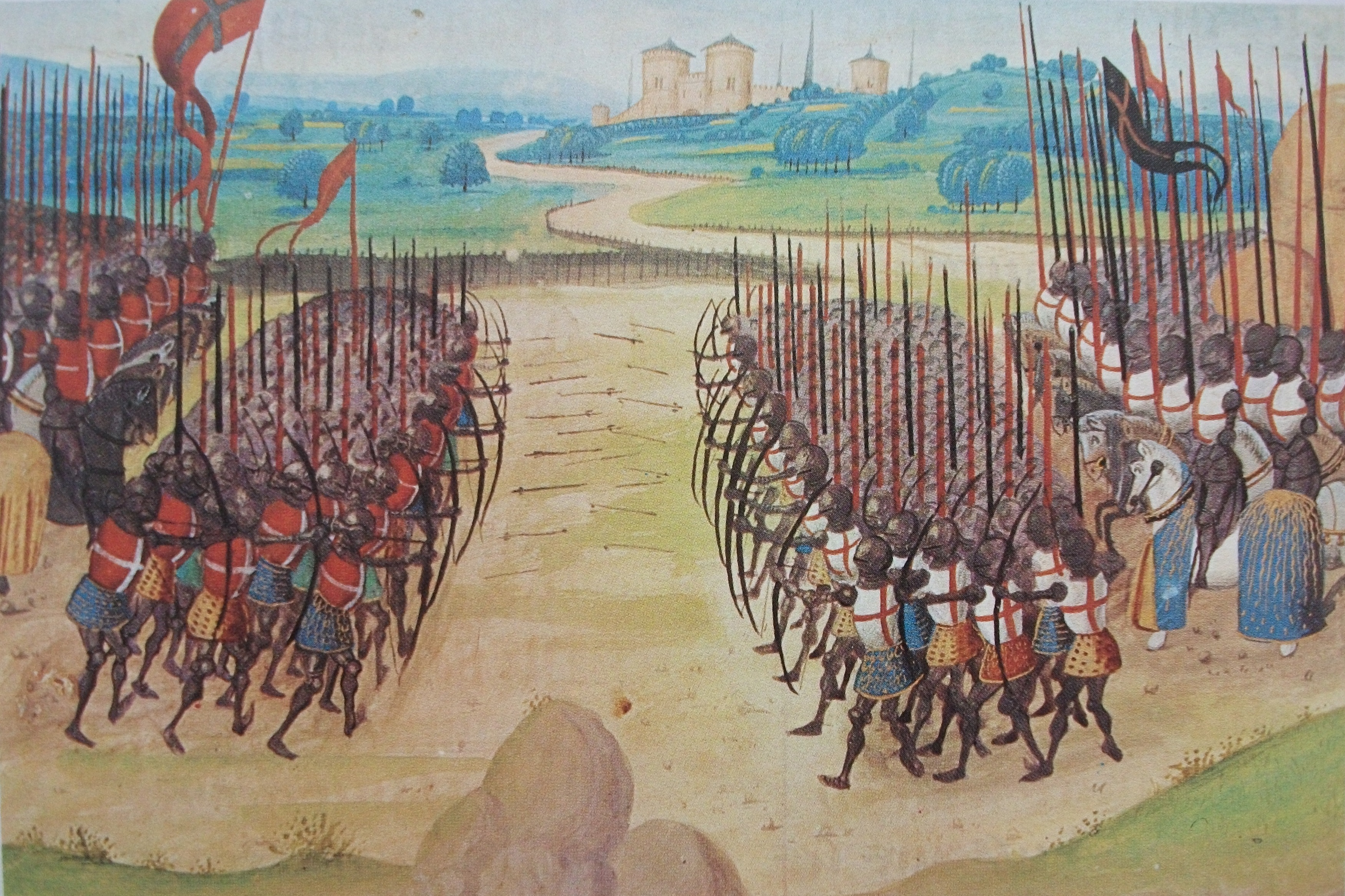
English soldiers (right) at the Battle of Agincourt

Les goddams (sometimes les goddems or les goddons) is an obsolete ethnic slur historically used by the French to refer to the English, based on their frequent profanities. The name originated during the Hundred Years War (1337–1453) between England and France, when English soldiers were notorious among the French for their frequent use of profanity and in particular the interjection "God damn". Outside France, the term has been used in French Canada. Related terms have existed outside the French-speaking world: Godames was historically used in Brazil, while Gotama was used in East Africa.

== See also ==
- Pardon my French
