= The Stage (album) =

Studio album by Avenged Sevenfold
- Released: October 28, 2016
- Recorded: 2016
- Studios: United (Hollywood); Serenity West (Los Angeles); Capitol (Hollywood); Joe's House of Compression (Pasadena, California)
- Genres: Progressive metal; heavy metal
- Length: 73:35
- Label: Capitol
- Producers: Avenged Sevenfold; Joe Barresi

Avenged Sevenfold chronology
Hail to the King (2013)	The Stage (2016)	The Best of 2005–2013 (2016)

Singles from The Stage
- 1. "The Stage" Released: October 13, 2016; 2. "God Damn" Released: March 21, 2017

Deluxe edition cover

Singles from The Stage (deluxe edition)
- 1. "Wish You Were Here" Released: October 6, 2017

The Stage is the seventh studio album by American heavy metal band Avenged Sevenfold, released on October 28, 2016, through Capitol Records. It was the first Avenged Sevenfold album in 11 years to not be released through Warner Bros. Records, due to a legal dispute between them and the band. It was also the band's first to feature drummer Brooks Wackerman, who joined the band in November 2015 but was not revealed as Arin Ilejay's official replacement until Ilejay's departure in 2015, because the band wanted to "make sure that it was a correct fit".

Written and recorded throughout 2016, The Stage was musically different for the band, marking a progressive metal sound. It is Avenged Sevenfold's first concept album, with its main theme being based on artificial intelligence and self-destruction of society. It is the band's longest studio album at 73 minutes and 35 seconds. In addition to being their longest album, The Stage features their longest song to date, "Exist", with a run-time of 15 minutes and 41 seconds. Upon release, the album debuted at number four on the Billboard 200. It received positive reviews from critics. The title track was nominated at 60th Annual Grammy Awards (2018) in "Best Rock Song" category.

== Background ==
In March 2016, Avenged Sevenfold held "March Mania", a tournament to find the most fan loved Avenged Sevenfold song voted each week by fans. On March 31, 2016, Avenged Sevenfold released a video on their YouTube channel and announced "A Little Piece of Heaven" was the winner, then gave an update on the new album, even giving a small clip of a new song, "Exist".

In October 2016, the band's logo, the Deathbat, was projected on major buildings around the world eventually leading up to the release of the first single entitled "The Stage" along with the music video.

== Composition ==
=== Music ===
In interviews prior to the album's release, rhythm guitarist Zacky Vengeance described the album as "pretty much completely aggro". The Stage has been described musically as progressive metal and heavy metal. The band continued to experiment with this album; "Sunny Disposition" features a section accompanied with brass instruments, while "God Damn" is one of the heaviest tracks on the album and has one of the most aggressive and fast-paced thrash metal riffs. The song also has a melodic bridge led by acoustic guitars, with M. Shadows' aggressive vocal style over it, creating a contrast. "Creating God" utilizes a D major scale over a D minor progression in order to give the chorus and solo a unique sound. "Paradigm" shifts between 12/8 and 4/4 time signatures, while "Simulation" uses 15/8 for the verses.

"Roman Sky" includes several orchestrated arrangements, similar to the ones throughout various songs appearing on City of Evil. "Higher" is one of the album's most melodic and progressive tracks. It features a female choir near the end, creating a very unusual and atmospheric outro harmonized with synthesizers, piano and a drifting bass line. The band's longest song to date, "Exist", in which Neil deGrasse Tyson makes an audio spoken word appearance at the end, which he wrote specifically for the album, showcases the band's further experimentation in progressive metal. Other songs also show elements of thrash metal and progressive metal, with some songs using fast drum patterns, blast beat and rapid riff structure, along with thrash-style shouting at some points. The album also includes an influence from their earlier metalcore style, including metalcore-style riffs and breakdowns, with "Paradigm" going as far as to include screamed vocals. The song "Fermi Paradox" has a black metal influence in the instrumental, with the blast beats and guitar work, but the band chose to put clean vocals over it.

=== Lyrics ===
The Stage is Avenged Sevenfold's first conceptual album (2010's Nightmare was planned to be a concept record, but such plans were nixed following The Rev's death). The album's concept is based on the future, having such themes such as artificial intelligence and self-destruction of society. It includes a variety of science-driven themes including nuclear warfare ("Sunny Disposition"), a failed NASA test ("Higher"), Giordano Bruno's death sentence ("Roman Sky"), space exploration ("Fermi Paradox"), simulation hypothesis ("Simulation") and religion ("God Damn", "Angels"), all of these themes and events taking place on the same "stage": Earth. Thematically, the album deals with mankind's relationship with technology. Lyrical content of the album was inspired by the writings of Carl Sagan and Elon Musk.

In an interview with Rolling Stone, vocalist M. Shadows commented as examples: "The song "Paradigm" talks about nanobots – and how they can potentially be used to cure diseases and help you live forever. But how much of a human being would you be at that point? If you're 70 percent machine and 30 percent human, are you going to lose yourself? Or a song like "Creating God" – computers are getting smarter and smarter, and all of a sudden they're becoming your god; they're so much more intelligent than you, you seem like apes to them, or ants".

The title-track "The Stage" talks about humanity and the way people have treated each other throughout history. It speaks from the perspective of a man growing up and realizing corruption of the world.

Closing track "Exist" was made as the band's approach to sonically represent The Big Bang, with the instrumental part in the first section (0:00-6:55) representing the creation of the universe and the second section (6:56-15:41) of the song representing the creation of Earth.

== Release and promotion ==
On October 28, 2016, the album was available for purchase on iTunes and for streaming on Spotify, following the band's live-streamed performance at the rooftop of the Capitol Records Building. Special bundles of the album were also made available on the band's webstore.

The band decided not to announce the album before its release, as vocalist M. Shadows stated "it completely takes away the mystique of the record" in an interview with Rolling Stone.

It was also announced on Chris Jericho's podcast "Talk is Jericho" that 7 new songs would be added via streaming services at some point. In a later interview with Kerrang!, the band said that 6 songs are cover songs, while there is one original song that was unfinished for the album.

The first additional track, a cover version of the Mexican folk song, "Malagueña Salerosa" premiered on Sirius XM Octane on June 8, 2017. The second track, a cover of Mr. Bungle's "Retrovertigo" was released on June 30, 2017. The third track "Dose", an original song, was released on July 12, 2017, as a part of a Dungeon Hunter 5 easter egg. On August 4, 2017, a cover of Del Shannon's "Runaway" was released. The song features rhythm guitarist Zacky Vengeance on lead vocals, and The Vandals guitarist Warren Fitzgerald on additional guitar. A cover version of The Beach Boys' "God Only Knows" was released on August 25, 2017. A cover version of The Rolling Stones' hit song "As Tears Go By" was released on September 8, 2017.

Along with the release of a cover of Pink Floyd's song "Wish You Were Here" on October 6, 2017, the band announced a deluxe edition of the album that includes all additional tracks and 4 live tracks, that was scheduled for a December 15, 2017 release. The release was later pushed back to December 22, 2017, due to unforeseen circumstances.

== Critical reception ==
Professional ratings
Aggregate scores
Source	Rating
Metacritic	74/100
Review scores
Source	Rating
AllMusic	3.5/5 stars
Alternative Press	4.5/5 stars
Classic Rock	4/5 stars
Exclaim!	5/10 stars
Kerrang!	4/5 stars
Metal Injection	10/10 stars
NME	4/5 stars
PopMatters	5/10 stars
Q	3/5 stars
The Guardian	4/5 stars

The Stage received positive reviews. At Metacritic, which assigns a normalized rating out of 100 to reviews from mainstream music critics, the album received an average score of 74, based on 9 reviews, which indicates "generally favorable reviews". Music critics praised the new progressive style adopted. The album was described as a mix of Iron Maiden's anthemic style and Dream Theater's progressive songwriting. Ultimate Guitar wrote "with a renewed focus on sonic experimentation, speedy metal riffs, and deeper lyrical themes, Avenged Sevenfold release a very fine record with The Stage.

Metal Injection even went on to say that The Stage is a "masterpiece", stating 'with its brilliant composition, vast and strong collection of sounds, this is the Avenged Sevenfold record that shines the brightest amongst the stars. The Stage isn't just a great step up from their previous work, but an outstanding addition to the halls of metal and rock that will forever be remembered.'

"What they did do was stick to their guns. And as the old guard of arena-filling hard rockers begin to diminish (physically, artistically), it's good to know there's someone dedicated to keeping the bar high." cited Jason Pettigrew for Alternative Press. NME's Anita Bhagwandas wrote that "it's evident the band have begun a new chapter where they appreciate rather than become their influences. They've truly arrived."

The album was also praised for its dynamic range and mastering quality. Angry Metal-Fi called The Stage "the best sounding metal record of 2016", noting how Avenged Sevenfold managed to break free from the loudness war.

In a mixed review, PopMatters' Chris Conaton wrote "Despite being a concept album, The Stage doesn't break much new ground for Avenged Sevenfold. They sound like the same band doing pretty much the same thing." Also in a mixed review, Exclaim!'s Bradley Zorgdrager cited "Though Hail to the King failed to live up to the royal expectations of its titular disguise, The Stage's grandiosity smells of overcompensation; Avenged Sevenfold's crown lies somewhere in between."

=== Accolades ===
Publication	Accolade	Year	Rank
Revolver Magazine	Top 20 Albums of 2016	2016	3
Loudwire	20 Best Metal Albums of 2016	2016	8
Alternative Press	30 Best Albums of 2016	2016	2
Ultimate Guitar	Top 25 Albums of 2016	2016	4
Rock Sound	Album of the Year	2016	8
The List	Best Albums of 2016	2016	-
Kerrang!	The 50 Greatest Records of 2016	2016	5

"-": denotes an unranked list

At the 2017 Loudwire Music Awards ceremony, the album won Metal Album of the Year.

== Commercial performance ==
Despite being a surprise release, The Stage debuted at number four on the Billboard 200 with 76,000 units, with 72,000 of that figure being pure album sales. As of January 2017, the album sold more than 170,000 copies in the US alone.

In 2025, Yarden Bibas dedicated the song "Roman Sky" to his wife, Shiri during her funeral, causing the song to top the Spotify charts in Israel.

== Track listing ==
All lyrics written by M. Shadows, all music composed by Avenged Sevenfold.

Standard edition
No.	Title	Length
1.	"The Stage"	8:32
2.	"Paradigm"	4:18
3.	"Sunny Disposition"	6:41
4.	"God Damn"	3:41
5.	"Creating God"	5:34
6.	"Angels"	5:40
7.	"Simulation"	5:30
8.	"Higher"	6:28
9.	"Roman Sky"	5:00
10.	"Fermi Paradox"	6:30
11.	"Exist" (narrated by Neil deGrasse Tyson)	15:41
Total length:		73:35

Deluxe edition bonus disc
No.	Title	Lyrics	Music	Length
1.	"Dose"			4:58
2.	"Retrovertigo" (Mr. Bungle cover)	Trevor Dunn	Dunn	4:39
3.	"Malagueña Salerosa" (traditional cover)	Elpídio Ramírez	Pedro Galindo	4:15
4.	"Runaway" (Del Shannon cover, featuring Warren Fitzgerald)	Del Shannon; Max Crook	Shannon; Crook	2:49
5.	"As Tears Go By" (The Rolling Stones cover)	Mick Jagger; Keith Richards; Andrew Loog Oldham	Jagger; Richards; Loog Oldham	2:54
6.	"Wish You Were Here" (Pink Floyd cover)	Roger Waters	Waters; David Gilmour	5:14
7.	"God Only Knows" (The Beach Boys cover)	Brian Wilson; Tony Asher	Wilson	3:34
8.	"The Stage" (live from The O2 Arena in London)			9:16
9.	"Paradigm" (live from The O2 Arena in London)			4:43
10.	"Sunny Disposition" (live from The O2 Arena in London)			9:32
11.	"God Damn" (live from The O2 Arena in London)			4:43
Total length:				56:37

== Personnel ==
=== Avenged Sevenfold ===
- M. Shadows – lead vocals, additional guitars on "Sunny Disposition"
- Zacky Vengeance – rhythm guitar, backing vocals, lead vocals on "Runaway"
- Synyster Gates – lead guitar, backing vocals, co-lead vocals on "As Tears Go By", classical guitar on "The Stage", 12-string guitar on "Wish You Were Here"
- Johnny Christ – bass, backing vocals
- Brooks Wackerman – drums

=== Session musicians ===
- Papa Gates – outro guitar solo (track 6)
- Jason Freese – keyboards (tracks 1, 2, 8, 10, 11)
- Brian Kilgore – percussion (tracks 4, 8, 9)
- Eric Gorfain – strings (track 5)
- River James Sanders, Tennessee James Baker – backing vocals (track 7, 8)
- Valary Sanders – nurse (track 7)
- Michael Suarez – additional sound effects (track 7)
- Angelo Moore, Walter Kibby – additional horns (track 3)
- Neil deGrasse Tyson – spoken word (track 11)
- Warren Fitzgerald – additional guitar ("Runaway")
- John Krovoza – cello
- Ian Walker – contrabass
- Stephanie O'Keefe – french horn
- David Ralicke, Nick Daley – trombone
- Jordan Kats – trumpet
- Leah Katz – viola
- Daphne Chen – violin

=== Production ===
- Joe Barresi and Avenged Sevenfold – production
- Andy Wallace, Josh Wilbur – mixing
- Bob Ludwig – mastering
- Paul Suarez – mixing engineer
- Ignacio Lecumberri – assistant mixing engineer
- Nick Fainbarg – technical engineer

=== Management and label ===
- Larry Jacobson – management
- Samantha Tripses – management
- Mitra Darab – Capitol Records marketing
- Hannah Keefe – Capitol Records marketing

== Charts ==
=== Weekly charts ===
Chart (2016)	Peak position
Australian Albums (ARIA)	4
Austrian Albums (Ö3 Austria)	10
Belgian Albums (Ultratop Flanders)	79
Belgian Albums (Ultratop Wallonia)	85
Canadian Albums (Billboard)	1
Dutch Albums (Album Top 100)	68
Finnish Albums (Suomen virallinen lista)	10
French Albums (SNEP)	47
German Albums (Offizielle Top 100)	14
Hungarian Albums (MAHASZ)	40
Irish Albums (IRMA)	16
Italian Albums (FIMI)	35
Japanese Albums (Oricon)	42
New Zealand Albums (RMNZ)	9
Norwegian Albums (VG-lista)	16
Portuguese Albums (AFP)	6
Scottish Albums (Official Charts)	12
Spanish Albums (Promusicae)	36
Swedish Albums (Sverigetopplistan)	37
Swiss Albums (Schweizer Hitparade)	17
UK Albums (Official Charts)	13
UK Album Downloads (Official Charts)	5
UK Rock & Metal Albums (Official Charts)	1
US Billboard 200	4
US Top Alternative Albums (Billboard)	1
US Top Hard Rock Albums (Billboard)	1
US Top Rock Albums (Billboard)	1

=== Year-end charts ===
Chart (2017)	Position
US Top Rock Albums (Billboard)	73
