= List of number-one hits of 1990 (Germany) =

This is a list of the German Media Control Top100 Singles Chart number-ones of 1990.

Key
†	Indicates best-performing single and album of 1990

Issue date	Song	Artist	Album	Artist
1 January	No release (Note: Same issue as for 25 December 1989.)			
8 January	"Another Day in Paradise"	Phil Collins	"...But Seriously" †	Phil Collins
15 January	"Another Day in Paradise"	Phil Collins	"...But Seriously" †	Phil Collins
22 January	"Another Day in Paradise"	Phil Collins	"...But Seriously" †	Phil Collins
29 January	"Another Day in Paradise"	Phil Collins	"...But Seriously" †	Phil Collins
5 February	"Another Day in Paradise"	Phil Collins	"...But Seriously" †	Phil Collins
12 February	"Pump ab Das Bier"	Werner Wichtig	"...But Seriously" †	Phil Collins
19 February	"Pump ab Das Bier"	Werner Wichtig	"...But Seriously" †	Phil Collins
26 February	"Pump ab Das Bier"	Werner Wichtig	"...But Seriously" †	Phil Collins
5 March	"Nothing Compares 2 U"	Sinéad O'Connor	"...But Seriously" †	Phil Collins
12 March	"Nothing Compares 2 U"	Sinéad O'Connor	"...But Seriously" †	Phil Collins
19 March	"Nothing Compares 2 U"	Sinéad O'Connor	"...But Seriously" †	Phil Collins
26 March	"Nothing Compares 2 U"	Sinéad O'Connor	"...But Seriously" †	Phil Collins
2 April	"Nothing Compares 2 U"	Sinéad O'Connor	"I Do Not Want What I Haven't Got"	Sinéad O'Connor
9 April	"Nothing Compares 2 U"	Sinéad O'Connor	"I Do Not Want What I Haven't Got"	Sinéad O'Connor
16 April	"Nothing Compares 2 U"	Sinéad O'Connor	"I Do Not Want What I Haven't Got"	Sinéad O'Connor
23 April	"Nothing Compares 2 U"	Sinéad O'Connor	"I Do Not Want What I Haven't Got"	Sinéad O'Connor
30 April	"Nothing Compares 2 U"	Sinéad O'Connor	"I Do Not Want What I Haven't Got"	Sinéad O'Connor
7 May	"Nothing Compares 2 U"	Sinéad O'Connor	"I Do Not Want What I Haven't Got"	Sinéad O'Connor
14 May	"Nothing Compares 2 U"	Sinéad O'Connor	"I Do Not Want What I Haven't Got"	Sinéad O'Connor
21 May	"Verdammt, Ich Lieb' Dich" †	Matthias Reim	"I Do Not Want What I Haven't Got"	Sinéad O'Connor
28 May	"Verdammt, Ich Lieb' Dich" †	Matthias Reim	"I Do Not Want What I Haven't Got"	Sinéad O'Connor
4 June	"Verdammt, Ich Lieb' Dich" †	Matthias Reim	"I Do Not Want What I Haven't Got"	Sinéad O'Connor
11 June	"Verdammt, Ich Lieb' Dich" †	Matthias Reim	"Auf dem Kreuzzug ins Glück"	Die Toten Hosen
18 June	"Verdammt, Ich Lieb' Dich" †	Matthias Reim	"I'm Breathless"	Madonna
25 June	"Verdammt, Ich Lieb' Dich" †	Matthias Reim	"Auf dem Kreuzzug ins Glück"	Die Toten Hosen
2 July	"Verdammt, Ich Lieb' Dich" †	Matthias Reim	"Auf dem Kreuzzug ins Glück"	Die Toten Hosen
9 July	"Verdammt, Ich Lieb' Dich" †	Matthias Reim	"Step by Step"	New Kids on the Block
16 July	"Verdammt, Ich Lieb' Dich" †	Matthias Reim	"Reim"	Matthias Reim
23 July	"Verdammt, Ich Lieb' Dich" †	Matthias Reim	"Reim"	Matthias Reim
30 July	"Verdammt, Ich Lieb' Dich" †	Matthias Reim	"Reim"	Matthias Reim
6 August	"Verdammt, Ich Lieb' Dich" †	Matthias Reim	"Reim"	Matthias Reim
13 August	"Verdammt, Ich Lieb' Dich" †	Matthias Reim	"Reim"	Matthias Reim
20 August	"Verdammt, Ich Lieb' Dich" †	Matthias Reim	"Reim"	Matthias Reim
27 August	"Verdammt, Ich Lieb' Dich" †	Matthias Reim	"Pretty Woman"	Various artists
3 September	"Verdammt, Ich Lieb' Dich" †	Matthias Reim	"Pretty Woman"	Various artists
10 September	"Tom's Diner"	DNA featuring Suzanne Vega	"Pretty Woman"	Various artists
17 September	"Tom's Diner"	DNA featuring Suzanne Vega	"Pretty Woman"	Various artists
24 September	"Tom's Diner"	DNA featuring Suzanne Vega	"Pretty Woman"	Various artists
1 October	"Tom's Diner"	DNA featuring Suzanne Vega	"Pretty Woman"	Various artists
8 October	"Tom's Diner"	DNA featuring Suzanne Vega	"Luxus"	Herbert Grönemeyer
15 October	"Tom's Diner"	DNA featuring Suzanne Vega	"Luxus"	Herbert Grönemeyer
22 October	"Tom's Diner"	DNA featuring Suzanne Vega	"Luxus"	Herbert Grönemeyer
29 October	"I've Been Thinking About You"	Londonbeat	"Luxus"	Herbert Grönemeyer
5 November	"I've Been Thinking About You"	Londonbeat	"Luxus"	Herbert Grönemeyer
12 November	"Sadeness Part I"	Enigma	"Luxus"	Herbert Grönemeyer
19 November	"Sadeness Part I"	Enigma	"Live"	Westernhagen
26 November	"Sadeness Part I"	Enigma	"X für 'e U"	BAP
3 December	"Sadeness Part I"	Enigma	"Serious Hits... Live!"	Phil Collins
10 December	"Sadeness Part I"	Enigma	"Serious Hits... Live!"	Phil Collins
17 December	"Sadeness Part I"	Enigma	"Serious Hits... Live!"	Phil Collins
24 December	"Sadeness Part I"	Enigma	"Serious Hits... Live!"	Phil Collins
31 December	No release (Note: Same issue as for 24 December.)			

== See also ==
- List of number-one hits (Germany)
