= I'm Breathless =

I'm Breathless: Music from and Inspired by the Film Dick Tracy

Soundtrack album by Madonna
- Released: May 21, 1990
- Recorded: 1989–1990
- Studios: Johnny Yuma, Los Angeles; Ocean Way, Hollywood
- Genres: Jazz; pop; swing
- Length: 45:08
- Labels: Sire; Warner Bros.
- Producers: Madonna; Patrick Leonard; Bill Bottrell; Kevin Gilbert; Shep Pettibone

Madonna chronology
Like a Prayer (1989)	I'm Breathless (1990)	The Immaculate Collection (1990)

Singles from I'm Breathless
- 1. "Vogue" Released: March 20, 1990; 2. "Hanky Panky" Released: June 12, 1990

I'm Breathless: Music from and Inspired by the Film Dick Tracy is a soundtrack album (Note: Defined as a soundtrack album by multiple sources and record charts.) by American singer and songwriter Madonna, released on May 21, 1990, in the UK and on May 22, 1990, in the US by Sire Records to accompany the film Dick Tracy. The album contains three songs written by Stephen Sondheim, which were used in the film, in addition to several songs co-written by Madonna that were inspired by but not included in the film. Madonna starred as Breathless Mahoney alongside her then-boyfriend Warren Beatty who played the title role, Dick Tracy. After filming was complete, Madonna began work on the album with Sondheim, producer Patrick Leonard and engineer Bill Bottrell. She also worked with producer Shep Pettibone on the album's first single, "Vogue". The album was recorded in three weeks, at Johnny Yuma Recording and Ocean Way Studios, in Los Angeles, California.

Musically, I'm Breathless consists predominantly of jazz, swing and pop songs. The tracks reflected Madonna's showgirl personality and were influenced by her relationship with Beatty. The singer wanted to create music that would fit the style and production of the film, set in the days of the Untouchables law enforcement, and sang the songs accordingly. In some areas she pitched her vocals and belted the notes when necessary. She smoked cigarettes in order to portray the vocals of her character Breathless. Beatty and singer Mandy Patinkin were featured as duet partners on three of the songs.

In support of both I'm Breathless and her previous album, Like a Prayer, Madonna embarked on the Blond Ambition World Tour where a section was dedicated to the songs from the album. It was critically acclaimed, winning an award at the 1990 Pollstar Concert Industry Awards. However, due to its use of Catholic imagery, Pope John Paul II called for a boycott of the show. After the tour was over, Madonna performed songs from the album at the 1990 MTV Video Music Awards and the 1991 Academy Awards. "Vogue", the first single from I'm Breathless, became one of Madonna's most successful releases, reaching number one in over 30 countries. It was also critically acclaimed and was seen as an influential song, while the video helped to bring voguing into mainstream popularity. The second and final single, "Hanky Panky", was a top-ten hit in the United States and the United Kingdom.

Music critics applauded the Sondheim numbers, along with Madonna's vocals and versatility. However, some deemed the non-film songs to be of little value. "Sooner or Later", one of the Sondheim tracks, went on to win the Academy Award for Best Original Song. I'm Breathless was commercially successful, peaking at number one on the European Top 100 Albums, as well as the national charts of Australia, Germany, and Japan—in the latter it became the country's best-selling foreign album of the year. It also reached number two on the US Billboard 200 chart and was certified double platinum by the Recording Industry Association of America (RIAA). I'm Breathless has sold more than seven million copies worldwide.

== Background and development ==
In 1990, Madonna was part of the film Dick Tracy starring as Breathless Mahoney, with Warren Beatty playing the titular character. Madonna told Premiere magazine that initially she had waited for Beatty to call her for the film. But when he did not, the singer decided to involve herself voluntarily. She pursued the part of Mahoney, but offered to work for minimum wages to avoid favoritism. Principal photography for Dick Tracy began on February 2, 1989, and ended three months later. The filmmakers considered shooting the film on-location in Chicago, Illinois, but production designer Richard Sylbert believed that Dick Tracy would work better using sound stages and backlots at Universal Studios in Universal City, California. Other filming took place at Warner Bros Studios in Burbank, California. Beatty often encouraged dozens of takes of every scene. The film was released in the United States on June 15, 1990, and was the third-highest opening weekend of 1990. Dick Tracy was the ninth-highest-grossing film in the US in 1990, and number twelve globally. The film also received positive reviews from critics. Roger Ebert from the Chicago Sun-Times praised the matte paintings, art direction and prosthetic makeup design, stating: "Dick Tracy is one of the most original and visionary fantasies I've seen on a screen".

Beatty had realized several positive aspects of hiring Madonna as an actress for the film. She would be inclined to develop a soundtrack for Dick Tracy and the film studio would see this as a promotional opportunity before the release of their product, since Madonna was popular as a recording artist. This would also benefit Warner Bros. Records, who would get a reason to release a new Madonna record. According to J. Randy Taraborrelli, author of Madonna: An Intimate Biography, by the 1980s, record labels started to release albums which were closely associated with a film, thereby gaining double promotion. These were mostly termed as soundtracks although many of them were not related to the film. After the shooting for Dick Tracy was over, Madonna started working on a soundtrack in the studio. She had begun recording three songs by Stephen Sondheim for the film—"Sooner or Later", "More" and "What Can You Lose"—which would be part of the album, but also had to write new songs comparable in style to the previous. Madonna also recorded "Now I'm Following You" whose version sung by Andy Paley appeared in the film. In her favor, she produced the entire album, including the Sondheim songs and thereby recorded them quickly in the studio. "I want people to think of me as a musical comedy actress. That's what this album is about for me. It's a stretch. Not just pop music, but songs that have a different feel to them, a theatrical feel,” she said at the time.

Madonna was in a relationship with Beatty at that time, and her whole acting, recording and singing stemmed from impressing him with the album, which was important to her. Beatty and actor Mandy Patinkin also lent their voices for songs from the album. While I'm Breathless was being completed, it still needed a lead single. At the same time, Madonna and producer Shep Pettibone decided to compose a new song called "Vogue" to be placed on the B-side of "Keep It Together", the final single from her fourth studio album, Like a Prayer (1989), to ensure that the song would fare better on the charts. When Warner executives heard the song, they decided to release it as an A-side, and was eventually included on the album. Despite not appearing in the film, "Vogue" was used in a commercial for Dick Tracy. I'm Breathless is one of three soundtracks released alongside the film, the others being the Dick Tracy: Original Soundtrack, and an orchestral score by Danny Elfman.

== Recording and composition ==
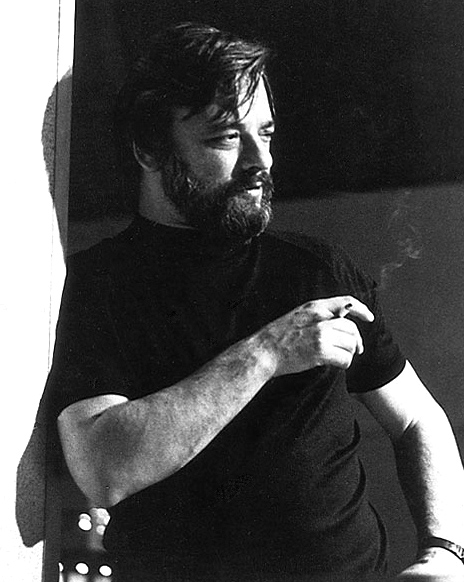
Stephen Sondheim wrote three of the songs on I'm Breathless.

I'm Breathless is a jazz, swing and pop album where Madonna and Sondheim tried to recreate the music of the period portrayed in Dick Tracy. According to Rikky Rooksby, author of The Complete Guide to the Music of Madonna, the harmonic and melodic styles were more "complex" than the songs which Madonna was accustomed to, hence she found it difficult and demanding. She spoke about the "wilderness" of the tunes, saying that she was not confident of doing justice to the songs, and neither was Sondheim. But he kept on encouraging the singer so that the recording sessions would not be affected. Madonna also recruited producer Patrick Leonard and engineer Bill Bottrell to help her with the project. She and Leonard toiled to create music that would fit the style and production of the film, set in the days of the Untouchables law enforcement. According to Lucy O'Brien, author of Madonna: Like an Icon, after Madonna's split from husband Sean Penn in 1989, the singer was comfortable in her new relationship with Beatty, which influenced the songs. The singer and Leonard enlisted a ten-piece live band and jazz musicians. The sessions took place at Johnny Yuma Recording and Ocean Way Studios in Los Angeles, California, and concluded by three weeks. The songs on the album reflect Madonna's showgirl personality where her singing ranged from "rootsy, rocking" in nature to slow, "laid-back and soulful" vocals. A studied approach was evident in most of them, which O'Brien compared to "an actress playing a part and performing a vocal exercise in technique". Some of the songs had Madonna pitching her vocals and belting the notes only when necessary. A dryness was prevalent in most of the singing, which was required for the songs and the setting. Guy Pratt, who also played bass, said that the singer "was in character and started smoking. She actually ponced a cigarette off me. Her character smoked, so therefore she did."

O'Brien said that the songs on I'm Breathless had a "coquettish" and "pandering nature", and was the polar opposite to Madonna's previous release, Like a Prayer, which had an introspective composition. I'm Breathless opens with the sound of an intercom and a shuffle, and power ballad "He's a Man" starts, a song which Madonna sings as if she was a "hooker stalking the boulevard". Also, Madonna's "haunting" vocals continue after the music has faded. One of the Sondheim songs, "Sooner or Later", evokes a 1930s jazz ballad with comping piano, brushed drum sounds, double bass, and horns. Conjuring the atmosphere of a smoky nightclub, the song finds Madonna in her lowest range as the melody shifts continuously. "Hanky Panky", the third song and second single, deals with sadomasochistic themes centered on a girl celebrating the pleasures of a "good spanking". It is performed in an almost comical style, and stemmed from a line in the film, where Breathless says to Tracy, "You don't know whether to hit me or kiss me".

"Sooner or Later"
A 20-second sample of jazz ballad "Sooner or Later" featuring instruments such as double bass and horn, and Madonna's vocals in her lowest register

The following track on the album, "I'm Going Bananas", is a Carmen Miranda-ish song done in a Spanish accent. A salsa rhythm is predominant, with Madonna squeezing her vocal cords while singing, backed by percussion and brass. In the fifth track, "Crybaby", Madonna mimics the vocals of Betty Boop. The melody is heard over the interlining synth strings, horns and trumpets, and a bass. Rooksby explained that Madonna sang about a guy who is "too sensitive and soft", and the chorus employs a chromatic chord sequence. The next track "Something to Remember" deals with her failed marriage to Penn and was the source of inspiration for naming her 1995 compilation album. Musically, it has melancholy chords and rambling melody, which according to Taraborrelli made it the most compelling song by Madonna.

Mark Coleman from Rolling Stone described "Back in Business" as a "nagging headache". It contains a "slow-verse-fast-chorus" sequence. According to Rooksby, "the chorus bursts into life, with Madonna clearly relishing the lyrics about good guys finishing last... the coldness of her delivery is apt for the topic." Her vocals are accompanied by muted trumpet sounds and a saxophone solo. "More" is the second Sondheim number where Madonna recites the materialistic-themed lyrics with irony, over a bouncy two-beat with tap-dancing during an instrumental break. The track consists of syncopated chord structure, tempo changes and lyrical rhymes. The arrangement switches between slow and fast tempo, requiring proper enunciation by Madonna. The final Sondheim song, "What Can You Lose", is the duet with Patinkin. It is a torch song where Patinkin supplies the male voice while Madonna sings during the second verse with strings and harmonics.

Madonna sings a two-part duet with Beatty titled "Now I'm Following You". The first part has strings, brass and muted horns, with a tap-dancing sequence during the intermediate piano solo and blues effect. At the last chord, the sound of the record getting stuck is heard, and a needle is drawn across the vinyl, leading into the much faster part two. With beats atop a riff, Madonna notes that "Dick" is an "interesting name". The word "Dick" is continuously repeated in the main melody structure until the song ends with the sound of a record being snatched off a music player. Bill Meyers, who played piano during the recording, recalled that the song required only one take from Beatty. "Vogue" closes out the album and is musically different from the rest of the tracks. It is a dance number consisting of a "throbbing beat" and lyrically has a theme of escapism. The song talks about voguing, a dance form which reproduced poses from high-fashion modelling. The song also has a rap section, where Madonna names various "golden era" Hollywood celebrities, including Greta Garbo, Marilyn Monroe and Marlene Dietrich.

== Promotion ==
Madonna first performed "Vogue" during her Blond Ambition tour (April–August 1990), followed by the September 6 performance at the 1990 MTV Video Music Awards, clad in 18th-century-inspired fashions. Madonna's performance recreated the royal court of Marie Antoinette, dripping with sexual innuendo; at one point the singer flipped open her large skirt, allowing one of the dancers to crawl inside. Her dancer Carlton Wilborn explained that "[such] level of production had never been done on MTV. The costumes, the fans, the drama... MTV just had no idea, we just came out and rocked." O'Brien described the performance as a "moment of inspired brilliance", while Taraborrelli noted it as a "classic, camp show that elevated the standards of future performances on that program". It was later ranked by Billboard as the sixth best performance in the history of the award show.

At the 1991 Academy Awards, Madonna appeared with singer Michael Jackson as her date and performed "Sooner or Later". According to journalist Liz Smith, Madonna had promised to perform at the award show if either "Sooner or Later" or "More" was nominated in the Best Original Song category. She wore a long, tight, white dress designed by Bob Mackie and covered in sequins and pearls. On her neck she wore $20 million worth of jewelry from Harry Winston. Taraborrelli recalled that Madonna had appropriated every move and mannerisms of Marilyn Monroe for the performance, making it a tribute to the actress. When she appeared onstage, there was technical difficulty resulting in the microphone not rising from below the stage, and a stage-hand supposedly passing it to her, though it is clear from the video that a microphone was already on stage before her entrance. However, one of her earrings did come undone, prompting her to toss it away dramatically as part of her act. Billboard ranked it as the seventh "most awesome" Oscar performance of all time, saying that "Madonna gave a performance that took us back to the glamorous days of old Hollywood."

=== Tour ===
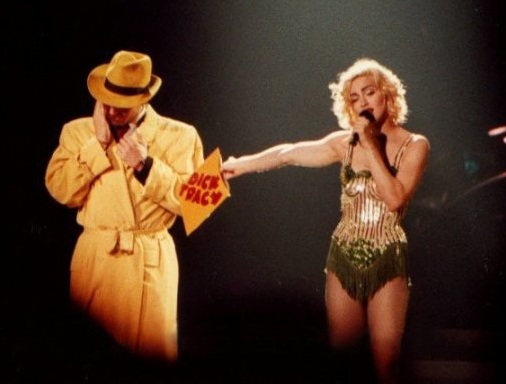
Madonna performing "Now I'm Following You" with a Dick Tracy lookalike, on 1990's Blond Ambition World Tour

I'm Breathless, alongside Madonna's previous album, Like a Prayer, was majorly promoted in Madonna's third concert tour, the Blond Ambition World Tour, which visited Asia, North America and Europe. Consisting of 57 dates, the concert was divided into five sections, the first inspired by the 1927 German expressionist film Metropolis, the second by religious themes, the third by Dick Tracy and cabaret, the fourth by Art Deco, and the fifth was an encore. The show contained sexual themes and Catholic imagery, such as in Madonna's performance of "Like a Prayer", which was based in church-like surroundings with Madonna wearing a crucifix and her backup dancers dressed like priests and nuns. The concert was criticized for its sexual content and religious imagery; in Toronto, Canada, Madonna was threatened of being arrested for obscenity, and Pope John Paul II later called for a boycott, with one of the three Italian dates being cancelled. Despite this, the tour was a critical success, winning "Most Creative Stage Production" at the 1990 Pollstar Concert Industry Awards.

The performance of the I'm Breathless songs began with "Sooner or Later" sung atop a grand piano, followed by "Hanky Panky", with Madonna standing in front of a microphone. She was dressed in a striped vaudeville-style corset, playing the part of a nightclub singer. Near the end Madonna joked: "You all know the pleasures of a good spanking, don't you? [...] When I hurt people, I feel better, you know what I mean?" The final song of the segment was "Now I'm Following You" where Madonna danced and lip-synched with dancer Salim Gauwloos, dressed as Dick Tracy. Regarding the "shameless promotion" of Dick Tracy in this segment, O'Brien said that "along with her yen for artistic expression, Madonna has always had an eye on the bottom dollar... [But] the Dick Tracy section is the least dynamic part of the show".

=== Singles ===
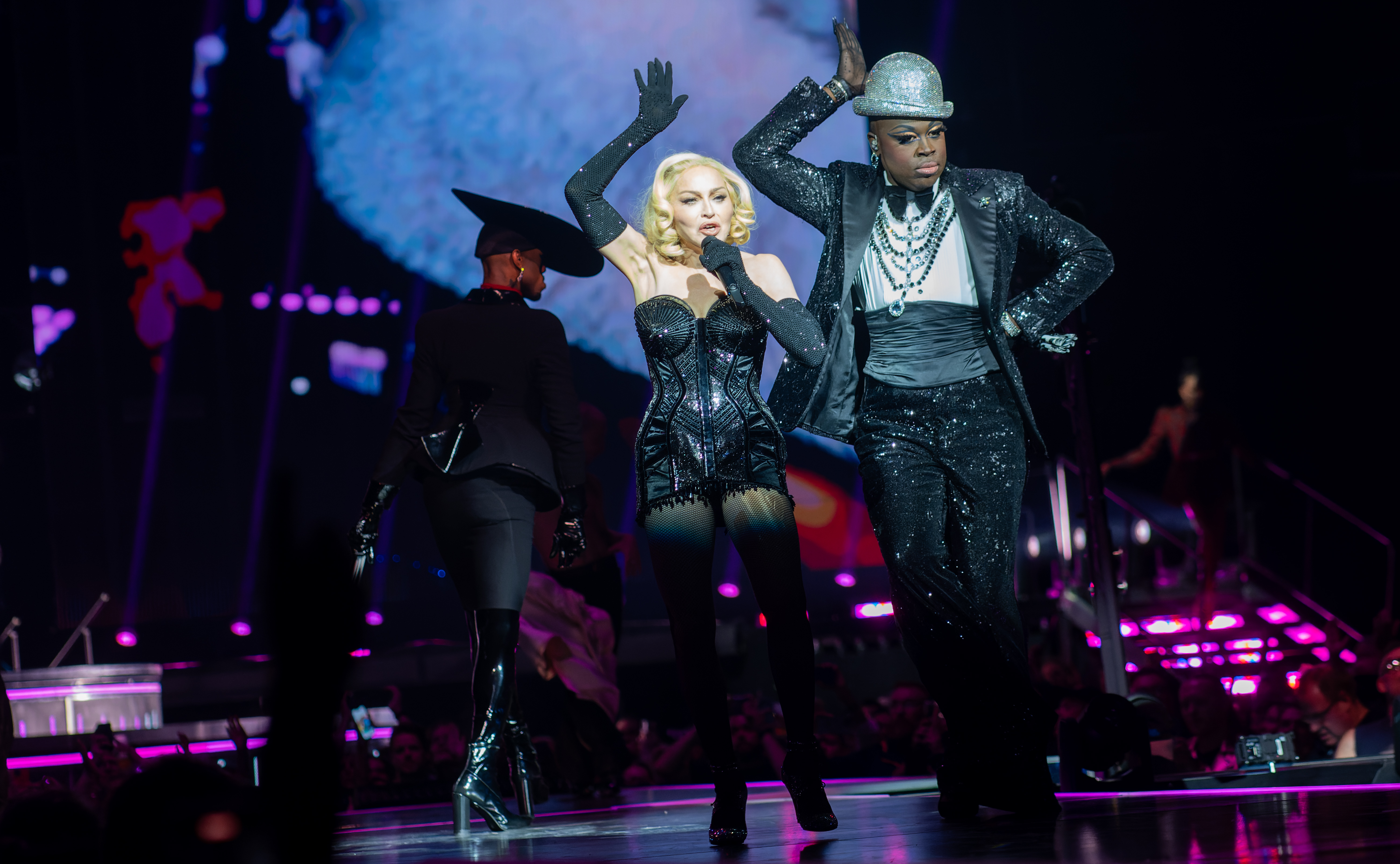
Madonna performing "Vogue", the soundtrack's lead single, on one of the concerts of the Celebration Tour (2023–24). The song topped the charts in over 30 countries.

"Vogue" was released as the lead single from the soundtrack, on March 27, 1990. A deep house influenced song, it became Madonna's eighth single to top the Billboard Hot 100 chart. It also reached the top of the Hot Dance Club Play chart. Internationally, "Vogue" reached the top of the charts in 30 countries, such as the United Kingdom, Australia, Canada and Finland. It became the world's best-selling single of 1990, selling over six million copies. "Vogue" has been continuously acclaimed since its release; reviewers have praised its anthemic nature, calling it a "funky" and "catchy" song, and listed it as one of the singer's musical highlights.

The music video for "Vogue", directed by David Fincher, showed Madonna paying homage to various golden era Hollywood actresses. Shot in black-and-white, the video takes stylistic inspiration from the 1920s and 30s; in it, Madonna and her dancers can be seen voguing different choreographed scenes. Critics noted the way in which Madonna used her postmodern influence to expose an underground subcultural movement to the masses and for making the sex and gender roles ambiguous in its portrayal of people. The video has been ranked as one of the greatest of all times in different critic lists and polls, and won three awards at the 1990 MTV Video Music Awards, out of a total of nine nominations.

The album's second single, "Hanky Panky", was released on June 30, 1990. Critical response for the song was positive, with The New York Times calling it "a calculated bid for outrage". It enjoyed commercial success, reaching the top ten in New Zealand and the United Kingdom. In the United States, it peaked at number ten in the week of July 28, 1990. "Now I'm Following You", the two-part duet with Warren Beatty, was intended to be the third single, but was ultimately canceled. Several remixes were commissioned and promos and test pressings were issued.

== Critical reception ==
Contemporaneous reviews
Review scores
Source	Rating
Entertainment Weekly	A
Q	3/5 stars
Rolling Stone	3.5/5 stars
The Village Voice	A−

Retrospective reviews and music guides
Review scores
Source	Rating
AllMusic	2/5 stars
Christgau's Consumer Guide	A
MusicHound Rock	2/5 stars
The Rolling Stone Album Guide	2.5/5 stars
Slant Magazine	4/5 stars
Spin Alternative Record Guide	3/10
Tom Hull – on the Web	A
The Virgin Encyclopedia of Nineties Music	3/5 stars

J. Randy Taraborrelli gave I'm Breathless a favorable review in his book Madonna: An Intimate Biography, writing that it was "one of Madonna's greatest musical moments", and praising her vocal performance. Authors Allen Metz and Carol Benson wrote in their book The Madonna Companion that the album suited Madonna well, but questioned her decision to make it a subsidiary for Dick Tracy instead of an independent release. Lucky Lara from Manila Standard Today denoted the album as a "surprise career decision" for Madonna and found that it showcased the singer's versatility and other facets of her pop personality. She added that the album was able to prove that Madonna "is cut out to do many other things, not just the trashy stuff". Writing for the Sarasota Herald-Tribune, Liz Smith gave another positive review, calling the album "excellent, different from anything [Madonna] has ever attempted", and listing the Sondheim songs as highlights.

Ray Boren from Deseret News was impressed with Madonna's vocals, calling them "sultry" and "cutesy", listing "Vogue" and "Something to Remember" as highlights. Greg Sandow of Entertainment Weekly gave I'm Breathless an A rating, praising Madonna for "invent[ing] a new Broadway vocal persona, built around a chest voice not yet perfectly under control but still much richer and duskier than her low range sounded before." Robert Christgau from The Village Voice said the record's "show-tune-pop-shlock" suits Madonna "with its pedigree of wit and musicality", as does the music's campiness, which she "sure knows how to do right". He listed "Cry Baby", "He's a Man" and "Hanky Panky" as the best tracks. Mark Coleman from Rolling Stone gave the album a rating of three-and-a-half out of five stars and positive review, claiming that Madonna "pulls it off with brass and panache". He added that "Vogue" showed the singer "can still deliver that indefinable something extra". Sal Cinquemani from Slant Magazine gave it four out of five stars, declaring: "I'm Breathless proves that Madonna is a true renaissance woman".

According to Jon Pareles of The New York Times, "after all the nuances Madonna has brought to the role of the bad girl, it's strange that she would settle now for such a restricted, unexamined version of respectability" and "for the first time, Madonna has let the deal dictate the music". Tan Gim Ean from New Straits Times noted that Madonna played against her strengths on the songs of the album. He described her vocals as "competent", but felt that the songs required "more range and agility than Madonna has at her disposal." Dave Tianen from Milwaukee Journal Sentinel described the album as a "mixed bag of period pieces, some of them too cute for their own good", adding that "I'm Breathless never becomes more than the sum of its mannerisms". AllMusic critic Stephen Thomas Erlewine claimed that the songs are just "cutesy novelty numbers", and listing "Vogue" as a standout track. Rooksby panned the album, saying that it "failed to transcend the sterile, preserved-in-amber quality of pastiche". Mark Cooper from Q magazine lamented, in its June 1990 review, "It's something of a disappointment because the lady herself stays so firmly committed to a character who's less original than the persona she evolved during the '80s." Nonetheless, in the same magazine's December 1994 issue, Madonna declared: "I would have to say the favorite record that I've made is the soundtrack to Dick Tracy. I love every one of those songs... My judgment is never based on the world's reaction." Music Week staff called a "mediocre soundtrack album".

While reviewing the album on its 30th anniversary, Mike Wass from Idolator wrote that its "genius" lied in the ability to "find the middle ground between Broadway fare and top 40 pop", concluding that "[Madonna] wasn't trying to bend and twist into another genre, she simply dismantled it and took the bits and pieces that pleased her". Rolling Stone's Joe Blistein deemed it one Madonna's most "fascinating" albums; "she could have easily recorded the three Sondheim songs for Dick Tracy and called it a day. Instead, she chose to deliver a record of big-band jazz and musical-theater pastiche". Nonetheless, he opined it wouldn't become a "forgotten classic", as the singer hasn't performed any songs from the album in any of her tours since Blond Ambition. He did finish his review by expressing: "[I'm Breathless] remains a compelling snapshot of a pivotal moment in Madonna's life and career, when the world rolled in ecstasy at her feet and she had the power to push it any which way she wanted, to mold it to suit her ideal".

== Commercial performance ==
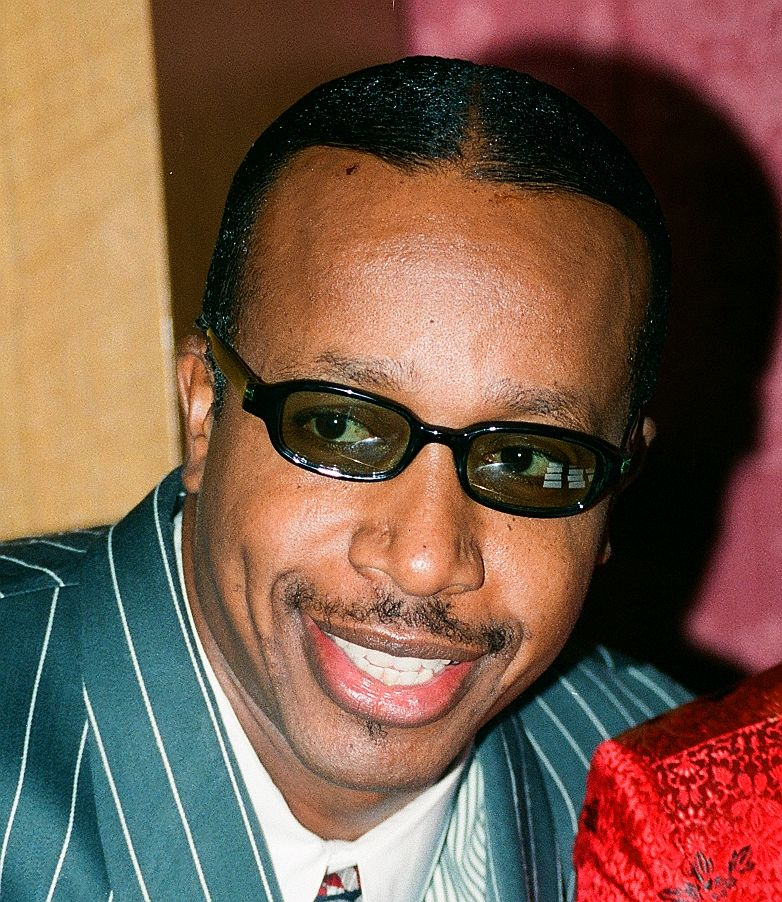
MC Hammer's Please Hammer Don't Hurt 'Em kept I'm Breathless from reaching the top position of the Billboard 200.

I'm Breathless debuted at number 44 on the Billboard 200 during the week of June 9, 1990, peaking at number 2 two weeks later. In total, the album remained on the chart for twenty-five weeks. I'm Breathless was certified double-platinum by the Recording Industry Association of America (RIAA), denoting shipment of over two million copies throughout the country. On June 2, 1990, I'm Breathless entered the Canadian RPM Albums Chart at number 39, eventually peaking at number three. During the week of November 10, 1990, the album spent its last week on the chart, exiting at number 99, after spending 24 weeks on the album's chart. To date, the album has been certified double-platinum by the Canadian Recording Industry Association (CRIA) for shipment of 200,000 copies.

In Australia, the album debuted at number one on the ARIA Charts, during the week of June 3, 1990, where it remained for three consecutive weeks, and a total of twenty-three weeks on the chart. It was certified platinum by the Australian Recording Industry Association (ARIA) for shipment of 70,000 copies. I'm Breathless entered the New Zealand Albums Chart at number twenty-eight during the week of June 3, 1990. The next week, it peaked at number two, spending a total of twenty-two weeks in the chart. In Japan, I'm Breathless became Madonna's second number-one album on the Oricon Albums Chart and had sold an estimated 329,382 units by the year end. At the 1991 Japan Gold Disc Awards, Madonna was honored by the Recording Industry Association of Japan (RIAJ) with Best Album of the Year – Pop Female, Grand Prix Album of the Year, and Grand Prix Artist of the Year; the last two were given for the best-selling international album and the best-selling international artist of the year, respectively.

The album also experienced success in European markets. In Germany, I'm Breathless topped the Media Control albums chart and was certified gold by Bundesverband Musikindustrie (BVMI) for shipping 250,000 copies. In France, the album peaked at number three, and was certified double-gold by the Syndicat National de l'Édition Phonographique (SNEP). In the Netherlands, I'm Breathless entered the MegaCharts at number twelve during the week of June 3, 1990. It eventually peaked at number five, staying a total of nineteen weeks on the chart. The Nederlandse Vereniging van Producenten en Importeurs van beeld- en geluidsdragers (NVPI) certified the album gold for shipment of 50,000 copies. On the Swiss Albums Chart dated June 3, 1990, I'm Breathless debuted on its peak position of number three. After nineteen weeks, it was certified gold by the International Federation of the Phonographic Industry (IFPI) for shipment of 25,000 copies. In the United Kingdom, the album debuted and peaked at number two on the UK Albums Chart, during the week dated June 2, 1990. Soon after, I'm Breathless was certified platinum by the British Phonographic Industry (BPI), denoting shipments of over 300,000 units. In Spain, the album peaked at number two, and was certified double platinum for shipping 200,000 copies. The album has sold seven million copies worldwide.

== Impact ==
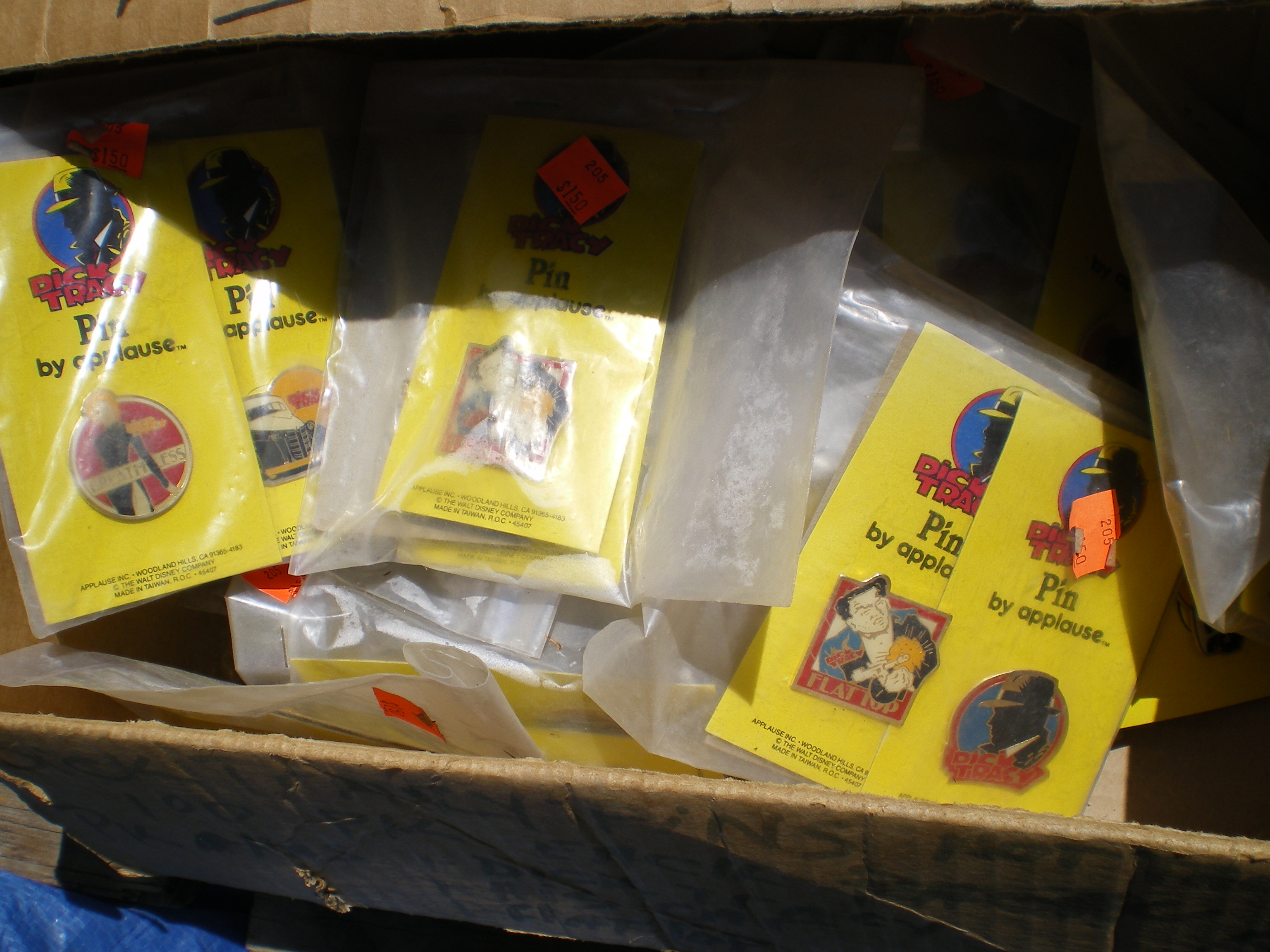
Merchandise related to Dick Tracy. With this era, Madonna brought back the glamour from the Prohibition era.

In The Soundtrack Album: Listening to Media (2020), editors explained that the trend of releasing albums with the concept "Music From and Inspired By" began "in large part due to the success of Prince's Batman album (1989) and Madonna's I'm Breathless". In his article titled, "Madonna puts '30s in vogue", music critic Jon Pareles described that the record represented the tie-in as triple play, with the album, tour, and film promoting "one another". Upon its release, Cashbox magazine said the album marked the kick-off to "the most opportunistic and protacted film soundtrack strategy ever mounted". With this release, Madonna brought back the glamour of the Prohibition era. Joe Blistein from Rolling Stone explained the album "recalled the Prohibition era more than anything in the contemporary zeitgeist".

Contemporary and retrospective assessments specifically praised the results despite her musical reinvention, seen as departure from her "main mass-market albums", according to O'Brien. Blistein described "it was a decisively dizzying left turn for an artist who'd already built a solid career out of them". In at least one interview, she herself calls I'm Breathless her "best" and "favorite" of her albums because it was "different". Macmillan Educational's publication, International Year Book: Covering the Year 1990, deduced that the album performed "surprisingly well, considering that its musical roots were in the 1940s". In Madonna: The Biography (1991), Robert Matthew-Walker notes the record contained the most songs on a Madonna's album up to that point, also arguing it shows the "immense outpouring of her talent". Others discussed how Madonna would introduce Stephen Sondheim to a newer audience in her generation, including Elizabeth Wurtzel from New York and Rolling Stone's Mark Coleman. In 2021, The Atlantic editor Sophie Gilbert, explicitly states she was introduced to Sondheim's material thanks to Madonna. Albert Montagut from El País called a "novelty" the fact Warren Beatty recorded a song for an album for the first time in his career.

=== Rankings ===
I'm Breathless was included in a number of critics' lists. The album appeared at number five in the 1990 Pazz & Jop: Dean's List of The Village Voice. The staff of Slant Magazine recognized the release as one of "The 10 Best Albums of 1990", commenting that it is in this album "where she truly started pushing outside her vocal comfort zone". Houston Chronicle and Stacker named it one of the "100 best movie and TV soundtracks of all time". Russell Ash included I'm Breathless in his Madonna's albums ranking section in the book The Top 10 of Everything (1999). Entertainment website E! Online commented: "The album is most fondly remembered for spawning one of Madge's most successful and influential tracks, 'Vogue'". The song "Something to Remember" was included in VH1's list of "Madonna's 25 Most Underrated Deep Cuts And B-Sides". The Official Charts Company also included "Back in Business" and "I'm Going Bananas" among Madonna's best deep cuts. Album's tracks "Sooner or Later", "Something to Remember" and "Vogue" were included in a rank of the best 100 Best Madonna Songs by Parade in 2023, with the latter topping the list.

== Track listing ==
I'm Breathless track listing^{[a]}
No.	Title	Writer(s)	Producer(s)	Length
1.	"He's a Man"	Madonna; Patrick Leonard	Madonna; Leonard	4:42
2.	"Sooner or Later^{[b]}"	Stephen Sondheim	Madonna; Bill Bottrell	3:18
3.	"Hanky Panky"	Madonna; Leonard	Madonna; Leonard	3:57
4.	"I'm Going Bananas"	Michael Kernan; Andy Paley	Madonna; Leonard	1:41
5.	"Cry Baby"	Madonna; Leonard	Madonna; Leonard	4:04
6.	"Something to Remember"	Madonna; Leonard	Madonna; Leonard	5:03
7.	"Back in Business"	Madonna; Leonard	Madonna; Leonard	5:10
8.	"More"	Sondheim	Madonna; Bottrell	4:56
9.	"What Can You Lose" (with Mandy Patinkin)	Sondheim	Madonna; Bottrell	2:08
10.	"Now I'm Following You" (Part I) (with Warren Beatty)	A. Paley; Jeff Lass; Ned Claflin; Jonathan Paley	Madonna; Leonard	1:35
11.	"Now I'm Following You" (Part II) (with Warren Beatty)	A. Paley; Lass; Claflin; J. Paley	Madonna; Leonard; Kevin Gilbert	3:18
12.	"Vogue"	Madonna; Shep Pettibone	Madonna; Pettibone	4:50
Total length:				45:08

Notes

- ^{^a}Track list per the end booklet of the I'm Breathless album.
- ^{^b}"Sooner or Later" is officially titled "Sooner or Later (I Always Get My Man)" in the film credits and Academy Awards.

== Personnel ==
Credits adapted from the album's booklet.

- Madonna – vocals, songwriter, producer
- Warren Beatty – vocals
- Patrick Leonard – keyboards, producer
- Shep Pettibone – producer
- Niki Haris – backing vocals
- N'Dea Davenport – backing vocals
- Donna De Lory – backing vocals
- Rev. Dave Boruff – saxophone
- Bill Bottrell – producer, mixing engineer
- Ned Claflin – songwriter
- Mahlon Clark – clarinet
- Jeff Clayton – saxophone
- Luis Conte – percussion
- Bob Cooper – baritone saxophone
- Kevin Gilbert – producer
- John Guerin – drums
- Abraham Laboriel – bass
- Charles Loper – trombone
- Bob Magnusson – bass
- Jennie Douglas McRae – backing vocals
- Jonathan Moffett – drums, percussion
- Abe Most – clarinet, alto saxophone
- Mandy Patinkin – vocals
- Tim Pierce – guitar
- Jeff Porcaro – drums
- Guy Pratt – bass
- Bill Schneider – piano
- Bill Meyers – piano
- Tony Terran – trumpet
- Carlos Vega – drums
- Randy Waldman – piano

== Charts ==
=== Weekly charts ===
1990 weekly chart performance for I'm Breathless
Chart (1990)	Peak position
Argentine Albums (CAPIF)	2
Australian Albums (ARIA)	1
Austrian Albums (Ö3 Austria)	5
Canada Top Albums/CDs (RPM)	3
Canadian Albums (The Record)	2
Dutch Albums (Album Top 100)	5
European Top 100 Albums (Music & Media)	1
Finnish Albums (Suomen virallinen lista)	1
French Albums (SNEP)	3
German Albums (Offizielle Top 100)	1
Greek Albums (IFPI)	1
Hungarian Albums (MAHASZ)	19
Icelandic Albums (Tónlist)	3
Italian Albums (Musica e dischi)	1
Irish Albums (IRMA)	1
Japanese Albums (Oricon)	1
Malaysia Albums (RIM)	9
Mexican Albums (AMPROFON)	3
New Zealand Albums (RMNZ)	2
Norwegian Albums (VG-lista)	4
Portuguese Albums (AFP)	1
Spanish Albums (PROMUSICAE)	2
Swedish Albums (Sverigetopplistan)	4
Swiss Albums (Schweizer Hitparade)	3
UK Albums (Official Charts)	2
US Billboard 200	2

2019 weekly chart performance for I'm Breathless
Chart (2019)	Peak position
US Soundtrack Album Sales (Billboard)	21

=== Year-end charts ===
Year-end chart performance for I'm Breathless
Chart (1990)	Position
Australian Albums (ARIA)	26
Canada Top Albums/CDs (RPM)	19
Dutch Albums (Album Top 100)	59
European Top 100 Albums (Music & Media)	7
German Albums (Offizielle Top 100)	34
Japanese Albums (Oricon)	34
New Zealand Albums (RMNZ)	24
Norway Spring Period (VG-lista)	15
Spanish Albums (PROMUSICAE)	8
Swiss Albums (Schweizer Hitparade)	23
US Billboard 200	42
US Cash Box Albums	22

== Certifications and sales ==
Certifications and sales for I'm Breathless
Region	Certification	Certified units/sales
Australia (ARIA)	Platinum	70,000^{^}
Austria (IFPI Austria)	Gold	25,000^{*}
Brazil (Pro-Música Brasil)	Gold	182,000
Canada (Music Canada)	2× Platinum	200,000^{^}
Finland (Musiikkituottajat)	Gold	37,039
France (SNEP)	2× Gold	200,000^{*}
Germany (BVMI)	Gold	250,000^{^}
Israel	—	12,000
Italy	—	300,000
Japan (RIAJ)	Platinum	329,382
Malaysia	—	16,700
Netherlands (NVPI)	Gold	50,000^{^}
Singapore	—	60,000
Spain (Promusicae)	2× Platinum	200,000^{^}
Switzerland (IFPI Switzerland)	Gold	25,000^{^}
United Kingdom (BPI)	Platinum	300,000^{^}
United States (RIAA)	2× Platinum	3,000,000
Summaries
Worldwide	—	7,000,000
^{*} Sales figures based on certification alone.^{^} Shipments figures based on certification alone.

== See also ==
- List of number-one albums in Australia during the 1990s
- List of European number-one hits of 1990
- List of number-one hits of 1990 (Germany)
- List of number-one albums of 1990 (Portugal)

== Bibliography ==
- Ash, Russell (1999). The Top 10 of Everything. Greenwood Publishing Group. ISBN 0-7894-4632-4.
- Cahill, Marie (1991). Madonna. Gallery Books. ISBN 0-8317-5705-1.
- Christgau, Robert (2000). "Madonna". Christgau's Consumer Guide: Albums of the '90s. Macmillan Publishers. ISBN 0-312-24560-2.
- Cross, Mary (2007). Madonna: A Biography. Greenwood Publishing Group. ISBN 978-0-313-33811-3.
- Guilbert, Georges-Claude (2002). Madonna As Postmodern Myth. McFarland. ISBN 0-7864-1408-1.
- Matthew-Walker, Robert (1991). Madonna: The Biography. Pan Books. ISBN 0-330-31482-3.
- Macmillan Educational Company (1991). International Year Book: Covering the Year 1990. Macmillan Publishers.
- Metz, Allen; Benson, Carol (1999). The Madonna Companion: Two Decades of Commentary. Music Sales Group. ISBN 0-8256-7194-9.
- Morton, Andrew (2002). Madonna. Macmillan Publishers. ISBN 0-312-98310-7.
- Nyman, Jake (2005). Suomi soi 4: Suuri suomalainen listakirja (in Finnish) (1st ed.). Helsinki: Tammi. ISBN 951-31-2503-3.
- Pennanen, Timo (2006). Sisältää hitin (in Finnish). Otava. ISBN 951-1-21053-X.
- O'Brien, Lucy (2008). Madonna: Like an Icon. Bantam Press. ISBN 978-0-552-15361-4.
- Reinsch, Paul N.; Westrup, Laurel (2020). The Soundtrack Album: Listening to Media. Routledge. ISBN 978-0-4298-3383-0.
- Rettenmund, Matthew (1995). Encyclopedia Madonnica. St. Martin's Press. ISBN 0-3121-1782-5.
- Rooksby, Rikky (2004). The Complete Guide to the Music of Madonna. Omnibus Press. ISBN 0-7119-9883-3.
- Ryan, Gavin (2011). Australia's Music Charts 1988–2010 (pdf ed.). Mt. Martha, VIC, Australia: Moonlight Publishing.
- Salaverri, Fernando (2003). Sólo éxitos: año a año, 1959–2002 (in Spanish). Spain: Fundación Autor-SGAE. ISBN 84-8048-639-2.
- Taraborrelli, Randy J. (2008). Madonna: An Intimate Biography. Simon & Schuster. ISBN 978-0-330-45446-9.
