= List of Dutch Top 40 number-one singles of 1990 =

These hits topped the Dutch Top 40 in 1990.

Issue Date	Song	Artist(s)	Reference
6 January	"All Around the World"	Lisa Stansfield	
13 January	"All Around the World"	Lisa Stansfield	
20 January	"All Around the World"	Lisa Stansfield	
27 January	"All Around the World"	Lisa Stansfield	
3 February	"Me So Horny"	2 Live Crew	
10 February	"Me So Horny"	2 Live Crew	
17 February	"Nothing Compares 2 U"	Sinéad O'Connor	
24 February	"Nothing Compares 2 U"	Sinéad O'Connor	
3 March	"Nothing Compares 2 U"	Sinéad O'Connor	
10 March	"Nothing Compares 2 U"	Sinéad O'Connor	
17 March	"Nothing Compares 2 U"	Sinéad O'Connor	
24 March	"Nothing Compares 2 U"	Sinéad O'Connor	
31 March	"Nothing Compares 2 U"	Sinéad O'Connor	
7 April	"Nothing Compares 2 U"	Sinéad O'Connor	
14 April	"The Power"	Snap!	
21 April	"The Power"	Snap!	
28 April	"The Power"	Snap!	
5 May	"The Power"	Snap!	
12 May	"Kingston Town"	UB40	
19 May	"Kingston Town"	UB40	
26 May	"Paint It Black"	The Rolling Stones	
2 June	"Paint It Black"	The Rolling Stones	
9 June	"Paint It Black"	The Rolling Stones	
16 June	"Paint It Black"	The Rolling Stones	
23 June	"What's a Woman?"	Vaya Con Dios	
30 June	"What's a Woman?"	Vaya Con Dios	
7 July	"What's a Woman?"	Vaya Con Dios	
14 July	"Dirty Cash (Money Talks)"	The Adventures of Stevie V	
21 July	"Dirty Cash (Money Talks)"	The Adventures of Stevie V	
28 July	"Dirty Cash (Money Talks)"	The Adventures of Stevie V	
4 August	"U Can't Touch This"	MC Hammer	
11 August	"U Can't Touch This"	MC Hammer	
18 August	"U Can't Touch This"	MC Hammer	
25 August	"U Can't Touch This"	MC Hammer	
1 September	"U Can't Touch This"	MC Hammer	
8 September	"I've Been Thinking About You"	Londonbeat	
15 September	"I've Been Thinking About You"	Londonbeat	
22 September	"I've Been Thinking About You"	Londonbeat	
29 September	"I've Been Thinking About You"	Londonbeat	
6 October	"Verdammt, ich lieb' dich"	Matthias Reim	
13 October	"Verdammt, ich lieb' dich"	Matthias Reim	
20 October	"Verdammt, ich lieb' dich"	Matthias Reim	
27 October	"Verdammt, ich lieb' dich"	Matthias Reim	
3 November	"The Joker"	Steve Miller Band	
10 November	"The Joker"	Steve Miller Band	
17 November	"Show Me Heaven"	Maria McKee	
24 November	"Show Me Heaven"	Maria McKee	
1 December	"Unchained Melody"	The Righteous Brothers	
8 December	"Unchained Melody"	The Righteous Brothers	
15 December	"Sadeness (Part I)"	Enigma	
22 December	"Ice Ice Baby"	Vanilla Ice	
29 December	"Ice Ice Baby"	Vanilla Ice	

== See also ==
- 1990 in music
