= List of number-one hits of 1990 (Austria) =

The following songs were number-one hits on the Austrian Singles Chart in 1990.

Issue date	Song	Artist
7 January	"All Around the World"	Lisa Stansfield
14 January	"All Around the World"	Lisa Stansfield
21 January	"All Around the World"	Lisa Stansfield
28 January	"All Around the World"	Lisa Stansfield
4 February	"All Around the World"	Lisa Stansfield
11 February	"All Around the World"	Lisa Stansfield
18 February	"Bakerman"	Laid Back
25 February	"Bakerman"	Laid Back
4 March	"Nothing Compares 2 U"	Sinéad O'Connor
11 March	"Nothing Compares 2 U"	Sinéad O'Connor
18 March	"Nothing Compares 2 U"	Sinéad O'Connor
25 March	"Nothing Compares 2 U"	Sinéad O'Connor
1 April	"Nothing Compares 2 U"	Sinéad O'Connor
8 April	"Nothing Compares 2 U"	Sinéad O'Connor
15 April	"Nothing Compares 2 U"	Sinéad O'Connor
22 April	"Nothing Compares 2 U"	Sinéad O'Connor
29 April	"Ding Dong"	Erste Allgemeine Verunsicherung
6 May	"Ding Dong"	Erste Allgemeine Verunsicherung
13 May	"Ding Dong"	Erste Allgemeine Verunsicherung
20 May	"Ding Dong"	Erste Allgemeine Verunsicherung
27 May	"Ding Dong"	Erste Allgemeine Verunsicherung
3 June	"I Promised Myself"	Nick Kamen
10 June	"I Promised Myself"	Nick Kamen
17 June	"I Promised Myself"	Nick Kamen
24 June	"I Promised Myself"	Nick Kamen
1 July	"I Promised Myself"	Nick Kamen
8 July	"I Promised Myself"	Nick Kamen
15 July	"Verdammt - ich lieb' dich"	Matthias Reim
22 July	"Verdammt - ich lieb' dich"	Matthias Reim
29 July	"Verdammt - ich lieb' dich"	Matthias Reim
5 August	"Verdammt - ich lieb' dich"	Matthias Reim
12 August	"Verdammt - ich lieb' dich"	Matthias Reim
19 August	"Verdammt - ich lieb' dich"	Matthias Reim
26 August	"Verdammt - ich lieb' dich"	Matthias Reim
2 September	"Verdammt - ich lieb' dich"	Matthias Reim
9 September	"Verdammt - ich lieb' dich"	Matthias Reim
16 September	"Verdammt - ich lieb' dich"	Matthias Reim
23 September	"Verdammt - ich lieb' dich"	Matthias Reim
30 September	"Verdammt - ich lieb' dich"	Matthias Reim
7 October	"Tom's Diner"	DNA featuring Suzanne Vega
14 October	"Tom's Diner"	DNA featuring Suzanne Vega
21 October	"Tom's Diner"	DNA featuring Suzanne Vega
28 October	"Tom's Diner"	DNA featuring Suzanne Vega
4 November	"Tom's Diner"	DNA featuring Suzanne Vega
11 November	"I've Been Thinking About You"	Londonbeat
18 November	"I've Been Thinking About You"	Londonbeat
25 November	"I've Been Thinking About You"	Londonbeat
2 December	"I've Been Thinking About You"	Londonbeat
9 December	"Sadeness (Part I)"	Enigma
16 December	"Sadeness (Part I)"	Enigma
23 December	"Sadeness (Part I)"	Enigma
30 December	"Sadeness (Part I)"	Enigma

== See also ==
- 1990 in music
