= Il est né, le divin Enfant =

Traditional French Christmas carol

- English: He Is Born, the Divine Christ Child
- Genre: Christmas carol
- Text: Traditional 19th century French carol
- Based on: Luke 2:6
- Meter: 7.8.7.7 with refrain
- Il est né, le divin Enfant Performed by the US Army Band Chorus in a bilingual French-and-English version

"Il est né, le divin Enfant" (French pronunciation: [il ɛ ne lə divin‿ɑ̃fɑ̃]), sometimes translated into English as "He Is Born, the Divine Christ Child" or simply "He Is Born, the Divine Child", is a traditional French Christmas carol.

== History ==
The melody was published for the first time in 1863 by Jean-Romary Grosjean, organist of the Cathedral of Saint-Dié-des-Vosges, in a collection of carols entitled Airs des noëls lorrains. The text of the carol was published for the first time in a collection of ancient carols, published in either 1875 or 1876 by Dom G. Legeay.

== Lyrics ==
The text of the carol details the birth of Jesus and the wait of 4000 years for this event, as foretold by the prophets. It both observes the humility of Christ's birth in a stable and calls on the Kings of the Orient to attend the child.

Gabriel Fauré wrote several arrangements, including for solo voice and organ (1888), for choir and organ (1923), and for children's choir and chamber orchestra (1938). David Willcocks, John Rutter and Kurt Suttner wrote modern choral versions.

The text of the carol has been translated into English numerous times. One translation that is close in meaning is that by Edward Bliss Reed (1930):

Refrain:
Il est né le divin enfant,
Jouez hautbois, résonnez musettes !
Il est né le divin enfant,
Chantons tous son avènement !

Depuis plus de quatre mille ans,
Nous le promettaient les prophètes
Depuis plus de quatre mille ans,
Nous attendions cet heureux temps. Refrain

Ah ! Qu'il est beau, qu'il est charmant !
Ah ! que ses grâces sont parfaites !
Ah ! Qu'il est beau, qu'il est charmant !
Qu'il est doux ce divin enfant ! Refrain

Une étable est son logement
Un peu de paille est sa couchette,
Une étable est son logement
Pour un dieu quel abaissement ! Refrain

Partez, grands rois de l'Orient !
Venez vous unir à nos fêtes
Partez, grands rois de l'Orient !
Venez adorer cet enfant ! Refrain

Il veut nos cœurs, il les attend :
Il est là pour faire leur conquête
Il veut nos cœurs, il les attend :
Donnons-les-lui donc promptement ! Refrain

O Jésus ! O Roi tout-puissant
Tout petit enfant que vous êtes,
O Jésus ! O Roi tout-puissant,
Régnez sur nous entièrement ! Refrain

Chorus:
He is born, the Heav'nly Child,
Oboes play; set bagpipes sounding.
He is born, the Heav'nly Child,
Let all sing His nativity.

'Tis four thousand years and more,
Prophets have foretold His coming.
'Tis four thousand years and more,
Have we waited this happy hour. Chorus

Ah, how lovely, Ah, how fair,
What perfection is His graces.
Ah, how lovely, Ah, how fair,
Child divine, so gentle there. Chorus

In a stable lodged is He,
Straw is all He has for cradle.
In a stable lodged is He,
Oh how great humility! Chorus

Jesus Lord, O King with power,
Though a little babe You come here.
Jesus Lord, O King with power,
Rule o'er us from this glad hour. Chorus

== Melody ==
Source
