= Sadeness (Part I) =

1990 single by Enigma

Single by Enigma

from the album MCMXC a.D.
- B-side: "Introit: Benedicta sit sancta Trinitas"
- Released: 1 October 1990
- Genre: New-age; downtempo
- Length: 4:16
- Label: Virgin
- Songwriters: Michael Cretu; Fabrice Cuitad; Frank Peterson
- Producer: Michael Cretu

Enigma singles chronology
"Sadeness (Part I)" (1990)	"Mea Culpa (Part II)" (1991)

Music video
- "Sadeness (Part I)" on YouTube

The Gregorian antiphon Procedamus In Pace! Cum Angelis. This music, quoted in "Sadeness", is taken from the Palm Sunday liturgy.

"Sadeness (Part I)" is a song by German musical project Enigma, released in October 1990 by Virgin Records as the lead single from their first album MCMXC a.D. (1990). It was written by Michael Cretu, Fabrice Cuitad and Frank Peterson, and produced by the last. The song features a French lyric whispered by Cretu's then-wife Sandra and became an international hit, reaching number one in 14 countries. In the United States it peaked at number five on the Billboard Hot 100 and number one on both the Dance Club Play and 12-inch Singles Sales charts. Its accompanying music video was directed by Michel Guimbard, featuring a scribe dreaming of wandering into The Gates of Hell. A sequel to the song, "Sadeness (Part II)", featuring Anggun, was released on Enigma's eighth studio album, The Fall of a Rebel Angel (2016).

== History ==
"Sadeness" was written by Michael Cretu (under the pseudonym Curly M.C.), Frank Peterson (under the pseudonym F. Gregorian), and Fabrice Cuitad (under the pseudonym David Fairstein). The song was named "Sadeness (Part I)" on its single release in Germany, and "Sadness Part I" on its single release in the United Kingdom and Japan. It is a sensual track based around "questioning" the sexual desires of Marquis de Sade; hence the German release name of "Sadeness", as opposed to the English word of "Sadness" used in the UK release. The track reached number one faster than any new release in German history - before its video clip had even been finished. The record company Virgin had done virtually no promotion on the song. Sales took off mainly on the strength of radio and club play.

In the 2017 book Stars of 90's Dance Pop: 29 Hitmakers Discuss Their Careers by James Arena, producer Frank Peterson recalled: "Well, we finished the song, and we were in total awe of ourselves. Michael's manager, who also managed Sandra, came out to Ibiza with us for a weekend, and we played him the track. He was sitting there listening and said, "That's very heavy going. You'll never get that on radio." We started thinking, "Oh shit." An hour later, our contact at Virgin tells us his secretary and other people at the office are fucking amazed by the song. He said he didn't get it, but everyone else seemed to love it. So pretty quickly the song came out."

== Music ==
The track makes use of the following:

- Gregorian vocals mostly sampled from the 1977 album Paschale Mysterium by the German choir Capella Antiqua München with conductor Konrad Ruhland. Particularly prominent is music from "Procedamus in pace!", an antiphon which is the second track on the album. The vocals were at first used without permission; a lawsuit followed in 1994 and was settled by compensation.
- The short drum fill is sampled from James Brown's song "Funky President (People It's Bad)".
- The track's main drum beat is sampled from the album version of Soul II Soul's 1989 song "Keep on Movin'".
- French lyrics whispered by Cretu's then-wife, Sandra, who at the time of Enigma's formation already had hit singles as a solo artist.

== Critical reception ==
"This is what I totally believe—the song combined so many things. It was culture, it was hip, it was new sounding, and people couldn't tell where in the world it came from. American, French, Italian? They had no idea. It sounded so familiar, but yet so foreign at the same time. I think that was the key to its success."

— Frank Peterson talking about the success of the song.

Ned Raggett from AllMusic commented, "Snippets of monks invoking the Almighty effortlessly glide in and out of a polite but still strong breakbeat, shimmering, atmospheric synth and flute lines and a Frenchwoman whispering in a way that sounds distinctly more carnal than spiritual (as her gasps for breath elsewhere make clear)." Keith Clark from Bay Area Reporter called the song "suggestive". Larry Flick from Billboard magazine described it as "brilliant and quirky", remarking that "it is currently the fastest-selling single in German recording history." He added that it "has already raised the ire of religious groups for its use of traditional Gregorian chants within the context of orgasmic groaning and a tribal hip-hop groove." Leah Greenblatt from Entertainment Weekly described it as a "incense trance". Irish Evening Herald called it "one of the most seductive dance records of the past couple of years". Swedish Expressen noted that church song are used "as a very reliable vocal generator".

Dave Sholin from the Gavin Report wrote, "Listeners may not have a clue what it's about, but the mood created by this totally unique production will keep 'em glued and wanting more. Not only have the Germans demolished the Berlin Wall, they had the good sense to make this a number one "sod - as in (Marquis De Sade) ness." A reviewer from Music Week described it as "chanting monks and a sensual muttering rolling over a hypnotically rolling slow beat". Ian Cranna from Smash Hits noted the "atmospheric lines" of the song in his review, adding that it's "combining medieval monks' chants and wispy, wistful synthesiser driftings over hippety-hoppety beats." Bob Mack from Spin called it "the Dark Ages disco cut". He added that "the track starts with a standard call and response—but it's one of monks doing Gregorian chants. After the beats kick in, synth washes buoy the flute flourishes, while French spoken words and heavy female panting get the point across." Kimberly Chrisma from The Stanford Daily felt the result of combining Gregorian chant with "pulsating synthesizers" was "an ambient fantasia that made the heart throb and the mind tingle."

Reviewing MCMXC a.D. for Rolling Stone, Chuck Eddy praised "Sadeness (Part I)", commenting on the unlikeliness of a hit single "[combining] the accidental da da appeal of Focus's 'Hocus Pocus' or Queen's 'Bohemian Rhapsody' with the sort of trendy, hipster credentials that come from getting played real often in gay discos," deeming this to contribute to the song being treasurable and adding: "Sprinkled with Gregorian chants, Vincent Price crackles, pidgin-French porn and who knows what else, the record suggests a monastery's worth of Franciscan friars droning their evening amens and then sneaking down the fire escape for a midnight massage session with the farmer's daughter down the lane." In 2011, Tom Ewing of Freaky Trigger wrote that, when the song was released, Enigma were "operating at least within shouting distance of credibility", with ambient music having become popular again, but believed that time had not been kind to the song, saying it "sounds today like an almost parodically generic chillout track. Its mysteries have evaporated – what remains is a ponderous mix of particularly banal elements. Gregorian chant? Synthesised pan pipes? Give over!"

== Chart performance ==
The single reached number-one on the UK Singles Chart on 13 January 1991, as well as in Austria, Belgium, France, Germany, Greece, Ireland, Israel, Italy, the Netherlands, Norway, Portugal, Spain, Sweden and Switzerland. It reached the top spot on the Eurochart Hot 100, where it remained at the top for nine weeks. Additionally, it was a top-5 hit in Australia, Denmark and Luxembourg. In the United States, the single peaked at number five on the Billboard Hot 100 singles chart in April 1991. The record sold over 500,000 copies in the US and was certified Gold there. The single has sold more than 5 million copies worldwide. It earned a gold record in Australia, Austria, France, the Netherlands and the United States, and a silver record in the United Kingdom. It also earned a platinum record in Germany and Sweden.

== Music video ==
The music video for "Sadeness (Part I)" was directed by Michel Guimbard, and received heavy rotation on MTV Europe in January 1991. It was produced by Thierry Sadoun, and depicts a scribe who dreams of wandering among cathedral ruins. He comes up to Auguste Rodin's The Gates of Hell; and as the scribe looks on, he sees a woman (played by French model Kati Tastet) beyond it, who whispers the main lyrics from the song to him. The scribe then opens the gates and, realising what he has done, attempts to flee, but is dragged through the gates. The video ends with the scribe waking up. It doesn't feature Sandra, Kati Tastet is lip-synching her vocals in French in the video.

== Impact and legacy ==
In 1992, "Sadeness (Part I)" won the Music & Media Debut Artist's Single Award. In July 2013, Complex included it in their list of "15 Songs That Gave Dance Music a Good Name", commenting, "We doubt that something like this, with lyrics in Latin and French that dealt with religion and the sexual desires of Marquis de Sade, would fly in today's pop charts, but there's something that was so undeniable about this new age/downtempo track that it was featured everywhere, from Single White Female to Tropic Thunder." In February 2022, Classic Pop magazine ranked it number four in their list of the top 40 dance tracks from the 90's, praising it as "unique".

== Track listings ==
- 2-track 7-inch single for France
1. "Sadeness Part I" (Radio Edit) – 4:17
2. "Sadeness Part I" (Meditation Mix) – 2:57
- 4-track 12-inch single for Europe
1. "Sadeness Part I" (Extended Trance Mix) – 4:57
2. "Sadeness Part I" (Meditation Mix) – 2:59
3. "Sadeness Part I" (Violent US Remix) – 4:57
4. "Sadeness Part I" (Radio Edit) – 4:14
- 4-track CD single for the UK
1. "Sadeness Part I" (Radio Edit) – 4:16
2. "Sadeness Part I" (Extended Trance Mix) – 5:04
3. "Sadeness Part I" (Meditation Mix) – 3:01
4. "Sadeness Part I" (Violent US Remix) – 5:03
- 5-track CD single for the US
1. "Sadeness Part I" (Violent US Remix) – 5:03
2. "Sadeness Part I" (Meditation Mix) – 3:01
3. "Sadeness Part I" (Extended Trance Mix) – 5:04
4. "Sadeness Part I" (Radio Edit) – 4:17
5. "Introit: Benedicta sit sancta Trinitas" – 3:04
- 2-track promotional CD single for Japan
1. "Sadeness Part I" (Ebi-Kuma Mix) – 4:40
2. "Sadeness Part I" (Meditation Mix)

== Charts ==
=== Weekly charts ===
Weekly chart performance for "Sadeness (Part 1)"
Chart (1990–1991)	Peak position
Australia (ARIA)	2
Austria (Ö3 Austria Top 40)	1
Belgium (Ultratop 50 Flanders)	1
Canada Retail Singles (The Record)	1
Canada Top Singles (RPM)	9
Canada Dance/Urban (RPM)	1
Denmark (Tracklisten)	5
Europe (Eurochart Hot 100)	1
Europe (European Hit Radio)	2
Finland (Suomen virallinen lista)	6
France (SNEP)	1
Germany (GfK)	1
Greece (IFPI)	1
Ireland (IRMA)	1
Israel (Israeli Singles Chart)	1
Italy (Musica e dischi)	1
Luxembourg (Radio Luxembourg)	2
Netherlands (Dutch Top 40)	1
Netherlands (Single Top 100)	1
New Zealand (Recorded Music NZ)	2
Norway (VG-lista)	1
Portugal (UNEVA)	1
Quebec (ADISQ)	36
Spain (AFYVE)	1
Sweden (Sverigetopplistan)	1
Switzerland (Schweizer Hitparade)	1
UK Singles (Official Charts)	1
UK Airplay (Music Week)	3
US Billboard Hot 100	5
US 12-inch Singles Sales (Billboard)	1
US Dance Club Play (Billboard)	1
US Hot R&B Singles (Billboard)	67
US Modern Rock Tracks (Billboard)	6
US Cash Box Top 100	6

=== Year-end charts ===
1990 year-end chart performance for "Sadeness (Part 1)"
Chart (1990)	Position
Germany (Media Control)	42
Netherlands (Dutch Top 40)	99
Sweden (Topplistan)	69

1991 year-end chart performance for "Sadeness (Part 1)"
Chart (1991)	Position
Australia (ARIA)	23
Austria (Ö3 Austria Top 40)	8
Belgium (Ultratop 50 Flanders)	50
Canada Top Singles (RPM)	68
Canada Dance/Urban (RPM)	7
Europe (Eurochart Hot 100)	3
Europe (European Hit Radio)	25
Germany (Media Control)	3
Israel (Israeli Singles Chart)	12
Netherlands (Dutch Top 40)	57
Netherlands (Single Top 100)	57
New Zealand (RIANZ)	13
Sweden (Topplistan)	12
Switzerland (Schweizer Hitparade)	6
UK Singles (OCC)	37
US Billboard Hot 100	63
US 12-inch Singles Sales (Billboard)	21
US Dance Club Play (Billboard)	24

=== Decade-end charts ===
Decade-end chart performance for "Sadeness"
Chart (1990–1999)	Position
Canada (Nielsen SoundScan)	64

== Certifications ==
Certifications and sales for "Sadeness (Part I)"
Region	Certification	Certified units/sales
Australia (ARIA)	Gold	35,000^{^}
Austria (IFPI Austria)	Gold	25,000^{*}
France (SNEP)	Gold	400,000^{*}
Germany (BVMI)	Platinum	500,000^{^}
Netherlands (NVPI)	Gold	75,000^{^}
Sweden (GLF)	Platinum	50,000^{^}
United Kingdom (BPI)	Silver	200,000^{^}
United States (RIAA)	Gold	500,000^{^}
^{*} Sales figures based on certification alone.^{^} Shipments figures based on certification alone.

== Release history ==
Release dates and formats for "Sadeness (Part I)"
Region	Date	Format(s)	Label(s)	Ref.
Europe	1 October 1990	7-inch vinyl; 12-inch vinyl; CD	Virgin	
United Kingdom	3 December 1990	7-inch vinyl; 12-inch vinyl; CD; cassette	Virgin	
Australia	11 February 1991	7-inch vinyl; 12-inch vinyl; cassette	Virgin	
Australia	18 March 1991	CD	Virgin	
Japan	21 April 1991	Mini-CD	Virgin	

== See also ==
- List of number-one hits of 1990 (Austria)
- List of number-one hits of 1990 (Germany)
- List of number-one hits of 1990 (Switzerland)
- List of Dutch Top 40 number-one singles of 1990
- List of European number-one hits of 1991
- List of number-one hits in Norway
- List of Swedish number-one hits
- List of number-one hits of 1991 (France)
- List of number-one singles of 1991 (Ireland)
- List of number-one singles from the 1990s (UK)
- List of number-one dance singles of 1991 (U.S.)
