= Paschale Mysterium =

- Cover artwork of the 1998 CD resissue

Studio album by Capella Antiqua München
- Recorded: 7–9 January 1976
- Venue: Pfarrhof Reuth, Aicha vorm Wald, Bavaria, Germany
- Genre: Gregorian chant
- Length: 49:31
- Label: Seon; Philips; (6575 076)
- Producer: Wolf Erichson

Paschale Mysterium is a Gregorian chant album by German choir Capella Antiqua München conducted by Konrad Ruhland, released in 1977 by Seon Records and Philips Records.

Several samples of the album were used without permission for the album MCMXC a.D. by Enigma. An example is the antiphon "Procedamus in pace!" which was used in the track "Sadeness (Part I)". The track appeared as a single in late 1990, shortly before the album was released. After a lawsuit in 1994, compensation was paid.

== Track listing ==
Side one

1. "Nos Autem Gloriari Opertet" (Introitus)
2. "Procedamus In Pace! - Cum Angelis + Psalm 24 (23), Verses 7-10" (Antiphon)
3. "Ave, Rex Noster, Fili David" (Antiphon)
4. "Hoc Corpus, Quod Pro Vobis Tradetur" (Communio) (Liber Usualis, No 573b)
5. "Ubi Est Caritas Et Dilectio" (Antiphon)
6. "Congregavit Nos In Unum - Ubi Caritas Et Amor + Psalm 133 (132), Verse 1" (Antiphon)
7. "Passio Domini Nostri Jesu Christi Secundum Joannem (St. John Passion) Excerpts: Joh. 18, 33, 36-37; 19, 1.5-6.15)
8. "Ecce Lignum Crucis" (Acclamation)
9. "Popule Meus & Crucem Tuam" (Improperien)

Side two

1. "Incipit Lamentatio Jeremiae Prophetae (Lectio I, Feria V)"
2. "Recessit Pastor Noster (Responsorium IV)"
3. "Oratio Jeremiae Prophetae (Lectio IX, Sab. S.)"
4. "Kyrie Eleison - Respice, Quaesumus, Domine"
5. "Hac Die, Quam Fecit Dominus - Elogium: Christus Dominus Resurrexit!"
6. "Halleluia & Psalm 117 (116) - 1-2 + Doxologie"

== Personnel ==
Performers

- Capella Antiqua München
- Konrad Ruhland – conductor

Production

- Wolf Erichson – producer
- Dieter Thomsen – recording engineer
