= Procedamus in pace! =

Gregorian chant

Procedamus in pace! (Latin for 'Let us proceed in peace') is a Gregorian chant. The text includes a quotation from Psalm 24:7-8. It is traditionally sung by the deacon before a procession.

== Recordings ==
"Procedamus in pace!"

Song by Capella Antiqua Munchen

from the album Paschale Mysterium
- Recorded: 1976
- Genre: Gregorian chant
- Length: 2.55

Procedamus in pace! was recorded by a German choir, Capella Antiqua Munchen directed by Konrad Ruhland, for Paschale Mysterium, an album of chants for Holy Week originally released in 1976.

The music was said to have been illegally sampled by Michael Cretu in a track on his 1990 new-age album MCMXC a.D.. The track, "Sadeness (Part I)", was also released as a single. In 1994, Polydor Germany agreed to an out of court settlement with Cretu due to his infringement of Polydor's "right of personality" due to his plagiarism, which resulted in Cretu paying compensation to the original creator of the sample.
