= Unendlich =

Unendlich (German for "never ending") may refer to:

== Albums ==
- Unendlich (Matthias Reim album) (2013)
- Unendlich (Schandmaul album) (2014)

== Songs ==
Songs named "Unendlich" appear on the following albums:

- I Luciferi by Danzig (2002)
- Laut Gedacht by Silbermond (2006)
- Des Wahnsinns fette Beute by Oomph! (2012)
- Herz Kraft Werke by Sarah Connor (2019)

== See also ==
- Die Unendliche Geschichte (film)
