= List of European number-one hits of 1991 =

This is a list of the European Music & Media magazine's European Hot 100 Singles and European Top 100 Albums number-ones of 1991.

Date	Song	Artist	Album	Artist
5 January	"Ice Ice Baby"	Vanilla Ice	The Very Best of Elton John	Elton John
12 January	"Ice Ice Baby"	Vanilla Ice	The Very Best of Elton John	Elton John
19 January	"Sadeness Part I"	Enigma	The Very Best of Elton John	Elton John
26 January	"Sadeness Part I"	Enigma	The Very Best of Elton John	Elton John
2 February	"Sadeness Part I"	Enigma	The Very Best of Elton John	Elton John
9 February	"Sadeness Part I"	Enigma	The Very Best of Elton John	Elton John
16 February	"Sadeness Part I"	Enigma	The Soul Cages	Sting
23 February	"Sadeness Part I"	Enigma	The Soul Cages	Sting
2 March	"Sadeness Part I"	Enigma	Innuendo	Queen
9 March	"Sadeness Part I"	Enigma	Innuendo	Queen
16 March	"Crazy"	Seal	Innuendo	Queen
23 March	"Joyride"	Roxette	Innuendo	Queen
30 March	"Joyride"	Roxette	Innuendo	Queen
6 April	"Joyride"	Roxette	Innuendo	Queen
13 April	"Joyride"	Roxette	Auberge	Chris Rea
20 April	"Joyride"	Roxette	Greatest Hits	Eurythmics
27 April	"Joyride"	Roxette	Greatest Hits	Eurythmics
4 May	"Joyride"	Roxette	Greatest Hits	Eurythmics
11 May	"Joyride"	Roxette	Greatest Hits	Eurythmics
18 May	"Joyride"	Roxette	Greatest Hits	Eurythmics
25 May	"Joyride"	Roxette	Greatest Hits	Eurythmics
1 June	"Wind of Change"	Scorpions	Greatest Hits	Eurythmics
8 June	"Wind of Change"	Scorpions	Greatest Hits	Eurythmics
15 June	"Wind of Change"	Scorpions	Joyride	Roxette
22 June	"The Shoop Shoop Song (It's In His Kiss)"	Cher	Joyride	Roxette
29 June	"Senza Una Donna (Without a Woman)"	Zucchero & Paul Young	Out of Time	R.E.M.
6 July	"Gypsy Woman (La Da Dee La Da Da)"	Crystal Waters	Out of Time	R.E.M.
13 July	"Gypsy Woman (La Da Dee La Da Da)"	Crystal Waters	Out of Time	R.E.M.
20 July	"Gypsy Woman (La Da Dee La Da Da)"	Crystal Waters	Out of Time	R.E.M.
27 July	"(Everything I Do) I Do It for You"	Bryan Adams	Out of Time	R.E.M.
3 August	"(Everything I Do) I Do It for You"	Bryan Adams	Out of Time	R.E.M.
10 August	"(Everything I Do) I Do It for You"	Bryan Adams	Out of Time	R.E.M.
17 August	"(Everything I Do) I Do It for You"	Bryan Adams	Out of Time	R.E.M.
24 August	"(Everything I Do) I Do It for You"	Bryan Adams	Out of Time	R.E.M.
31 August	"(Everything I Do) I Do It for You"	Bryan Adams	Out of Time	R.E.M.
7 September	"(Everything I Do) I Do It for You"	Bryan Adams	Out of Time	R.E.M.
14 September	"(Everything I Do) I Do It for You"	Bryan Adams	Out of Time	R.E.M.
21 September	"(Everything I Do) I Do It for You"	Bryan Adams	Out of Time	R.E.M.
28 September	"(Everything I Do) I Do It for You"	Bryan Adams	Out of Time	R.E.M.
5 October	"(Everything I Do) I Do It for You"	Bryan Adams	On Every Street	Dire Straits
12 October	"(Everything I Do) I Do It for You"	Bryan Adams	On Every Street	Dire Straits
19 October	"(Everything I Do) I Do It for You"	Bryan Adams	On Every Street	Dire Straits
26 October	"(Everything I Do) I Do It for You"	Bryan Adams	On Every Street	Dire Straits
2 November	"(Everything I Do) I Do It for You"	Bryan Adams	On Every Street	Dire Straits
9 November	"(Everything I Do) I Do It for You"	Bryan Adams	Waking Up the Neighbours	Bryan Adams
16 November	"(Everything I Do) I Do It for You"	Bryan Adams	Waking Up the Neighbours	Bryan Adams
23 November	"(Everything I Do) I Do It for You"	Bryan Adams	Waking Up the Neighbours	Bryan Adams
30 November	"Black or White"	Michael Jackson	Waking Up the Neighbours	Bryan Adams
7 December	"Black or White"	Michael Jackson	We Can't Dance	Genesis
14 December	"Black or White"	Michael Jackson	Dangerous	Michael Jackson
21 December	"Black or White"	Michael Jackson	Dangerous	Michael Jackson
28 December	"Black or White"	Michael Jackson	Dangerous	Michael Jackson
