= Claudius Ash =

English goldsmith (1792–1854)

- Born: 1792
- Died: 1854
- Occupation(s): Goldsmith and dental manufacturer

Claudius Ash (1792–1854) was an English goldsmith and dental manufacturer.

== Personal life ==
The second son of Sarjeant Ash (1754–1820) and Lydia Ash née Smith, Claudius Ash was born in Bethnal Green, London, on 2 March 1792. He married Sarah Butler on 11 March 1813 and had eight children, four of whom, along with other members of the Ash family and their descendants, were engaged in dental manufacturing or practised as dental surgeons. Claudius Ash’s family were members of the Catholic Apostolic Church (Irvingites). He died in London on 3 November 1854.

== Work ==
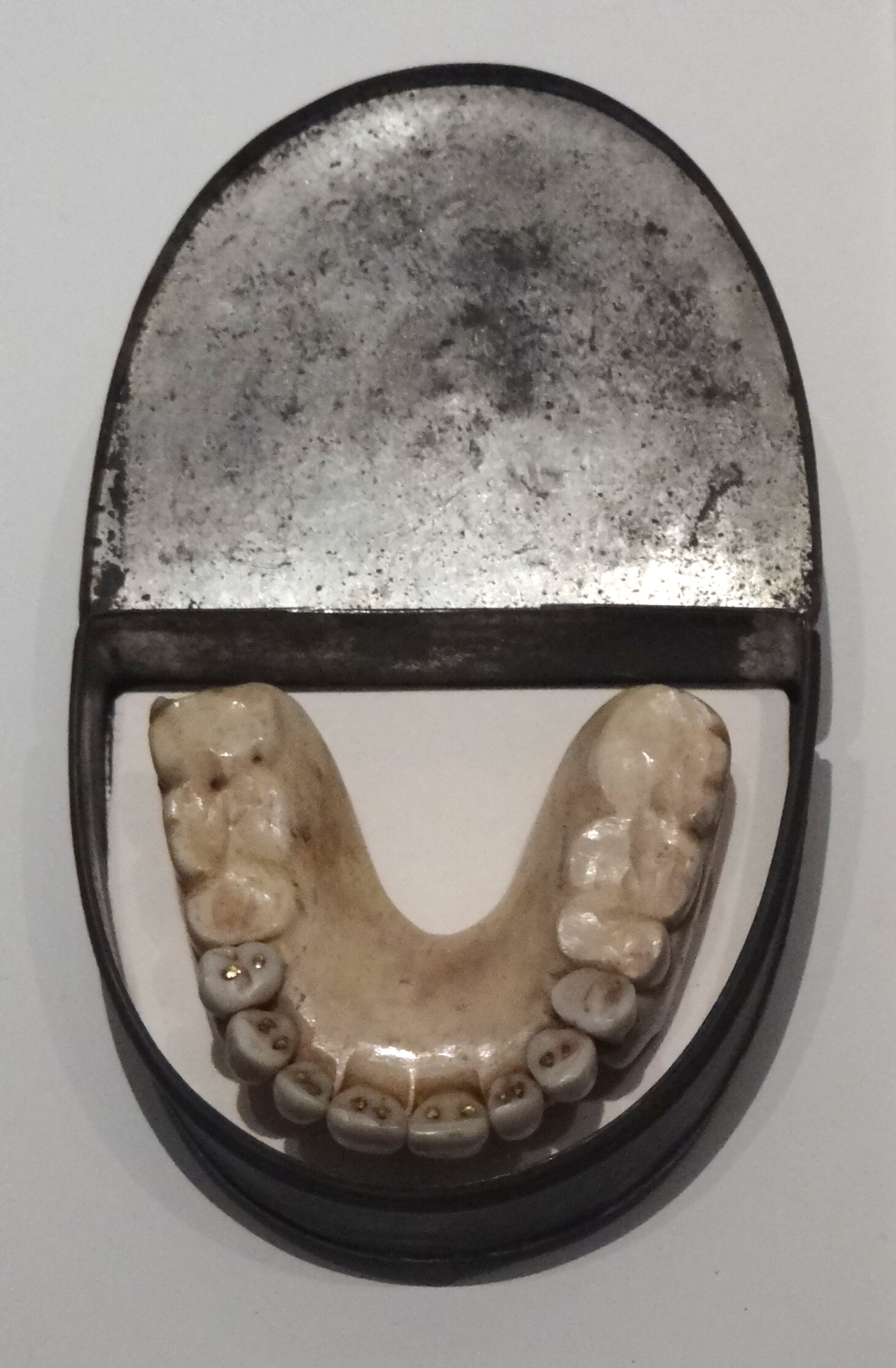
Dentures with Waterloo Teeth

Claudius Ash followed his father into the profession of silversmithing and goldsmithing in the firm of Ash & Sons, 64 St James’s Street, Westminster. In about 1820 he was asked to apply his craftsmanship to making a set of dentures. Up to this time, the majority of false teeth were made from hippopotamus or walrus ivory that was prone to discolouring, or from human teeth extracted from dead bodies, including battlefield casualties (thus known as ‘Waterloo teeth’). Ash’s teeth, made of porcelain mounted on gold plates, with gold springs and swivels, were considered superior both aesthetically and functionally and laid the foundation of his new enterprise as Britain’s foremost manufacturer of dentures and dental appliances. Originally based in Broad Street (now Broadwick Street), London, the business expanded rapidly and by the mid-nineteenth century Claudius Ash dentures and dental equipment dominated the European market. Claudius Ash & Sons became an international company, in 1924 merging with de Trey & Company to form the Amalgamated Dental Company; it is now a division of Plandent Limited.

== See also ==
- Russell Ash, modern-day relative
