= Vergiß Es (Forget It) =

Single by Matthias Reim and Bonnie Tyler

from the album Déjà Vu
- Released: 13 September 2004
- Genre: Rock
- Length: 3:14 (radio version); 3:37 (album version)
- Label: EMI
- Songwriter(s): André Frankl, Joachim Horn-Bernges, Stuart Emerson
- Producer(s): Matthias Reim

Matthias Reim singles chronology
"Halt durch" (2004)	"Vergiß Es (Forget It)" (2004)	"Jedes Bild von dir" (2004)

Bonnie Tyler singles chronology
"Si tout s'arrête (It's a Heartache)" (2003)	"Vergiß Es (Forget It)" (2004)	"Louise" (2005)

"Vergiß Es (Forget It)" is a single from Matthias Reim's 2004 compilation "Déjà Vu", with guest vocals from Bonnie Tyler. The song is bilingual, with lyrics in German and English. The single was a major hit in Ukraine and a minor hit in Germany.

== Lyrics, promotion and performances ==
Vergiss es
Du wirst mich nie mehr wieder los
Mein Herz hängt viel zu sehr an dir
Und deins an mir

— German version of the chorus

Reim and Tyler recorded two versions of the song; one in German and English, and the other completely in English.

In the German/English version, the song has two choruses, once in German and then in English. The first chorus (right) is sung in English at the end. In the English version, the German chorus is translated.

Reim and Tyler were interviewed in 2004 in conjunction with the release of the single. Tyler stated that she had performed in festivals alongside Reim and thought that due to a similar German fan base, the single would be successful and a good idea to record. They also performed the single on several German TV shows.

On 4 and 5 June 2010 Tyler supported Reim in concerts in Eberswalde and Kamenz, Germany. They performed "Vergiß Es (Forget It)" live.

== CD single ==
A CD single was released in Germany, also available for digital download.

No.	Title	Length
1.	"Vergiss Es (Forget It) (Radio Version)"	3:14
2.	"Vergiss Es (Forget It)"	3:36
3.	"Forget It"	3:37
4.	"Hallo, ich möcht gern wissen..."	3:34

== Charts ==
Chart (2004)	Peak position
Germany (GfK)	64

== Personnel ==
- Producer – Matthias Reim
- Co-producer – André Franke
- Mixing – Berne Staub (from Avalon Studio, Zürich) (track 1, 2 and 3). Gary Jones (Ibiza Music Factory) (track 4)
- Recording studios – Stuart Emerson Music, Kobalt Music, Warner Chappell (tracks 1, 2 and 3). Polygram Songs (track 4)
