= Hanky Panky (Madonna song) =

1990 single by Madonna

Single by Madonna

from the album I'm Breathless
- B-side: "More"
- Released: June 12, 1990
- Studio: Johnny Yuma Recording; Ocean Way Studios; (Los Angeles, California)
- Genre: Jazz; swing
- Length: 3:57
- Label: Sire; Warner Bros.
- Songwriters: Madonna; Patrick Leonard
- Producers: Madonna; Leonard

Madonna singles chronology
"Vogue" (1990)	"Hanky Panky" (1990)	"Justify My Love" (1990)

Licensed audio
- "Hanky Panky" on YouTube

"Hanky Panky" is a song by American singer Madonna from her soundtrack album I'm Breathless (1990). It was released on June 12, 1990, by Sire Records as the album's second and final single. Written and produced by Madonna and Patrick Leonard, the song was developed from a line in the parent film, Dick Tracy, talking about a woman who enjoys being spanked by her partner. Performed in a playful, “tongue-in-cheek” style, "Hanky Panky" is a jazz and swing song, keeping with the film's general theme of the 1920s and 1930s, with a changing bassline and minor to major key-shift in the chorus.

The song garnered positive response from music critics, many of them highlighting its lyrical content. It caused some controversy in Ireland because of its innuendo and racy lyrics, with women's groups deeming them harmful; Madonna later clarified that the lyrics were intended as a joke. "Hanky Panky" was a top-ten hit in many countries including Australia, Ireland, Italy, the United Kingdom and the United States while topping the chart in Finland. Madonna has performed the song on two of her concert tours: Blond Ambition (1990) and Re-Invention (2004). The song has been covered by several tribute acts and was also performed on the television series Ally McBeal (1997).

== Background and release ==
In 1990, Madonna starred in the film Dick Tracy as Breathless Mahoney—a new role introduced for her—with Warren Beatty, her boyfriend at the time, playing the titular character. After the shooting for Dick Tracy was over, Madonna started working on the soundtrack. She had begun recording three songs written by Stephen Sondheim for the film—"Sooner or Later", "More" and "What Can You Lose"—which would be part of the album, but also had to write and develop new songs comparable in style to her previous releases. She produced the entire album, including the Sondheim songs. "I want people to think of me as a musical comedy actress. That's what this album is about for me. It's a stretch. Not just pop music, but songs that have a different feel to them, a theatrical feel", she said at the time.

Madonna recruited producer Patrick Leonard and engineer Bill Bottrell to help her with the project. She and Leonard toiled to create music that would fit the style and production of the film, set in the days of the Untouchables law enforcement. "Hanky Panky" was written and produced by Madonna and Leonard and was released as the second and final single from I'm Breathless on June 12, 1990. The cassette and the 7-inch versions had "More", another song from the album as its B-side, while the 12-inch releases had two remixes of the song by Kevin Gilbert. Cover photograph for the single was done by Patrick Demarchelier with Jeri Heiden designing the sleeves.

== Recording and composition ==
'Hanky Panky'
A 22 second sample of "Hanky Panky". In the song, Madonna speaks about enjoying the pleasures a "good spanky" can bring.

"Hanky Panky" was recorded within the three weeks time taken for the whole project. Personnel working on the song included Leonard on keyboards, Jeff Porcaro on drums, Guy Pratt on bass and Donna De Lory, Niki Haris and N'Dea Davenport on background vocals. Lyrically, the song deals with sadomasochistic themes and is centred around a girl who celebrates the pleasures of a "good spanking". It is performed in an almost comical style and stemmed from a line in the film, where Breathless says to Tracy, "You don't know whether to hit me or kiss me". The track has a false introduction and starts slowly with piano, but changes after a few moments into a large jazz and swing song, with a changing bassline and minor to major key-shift in the chorus. According to the sheet music published by Musicnotes.com, the song is set in common time, with a tempo of 170 beats per minute. It is composed in the key of D minor, with Madonna's vocals spanning from B♭_{3} to D_{5}. The song has a basic sequence of Dm–C–Bm–A_{7}sus in the beginning and changes to Dm–A–B♭_{9}–A_{7}–Dm–C when the swing starts. During an interview with Rolling Stone, Madonna explained:

The spanking thing started because I believed that my character in Dick Tracy liked to get smacked around and that's why she hung around with people like Al Pacino's character. Warren [Beatty] asked me to write some songs, and one of them—the hanky-panky song—was about that. I say in the song 'Nothing like a good spanky', and in the middle, I say, 'Ooh, my bottom hurts just thinking about it'. When it came out everybody started asking, 'Do you like to get spanked?' and I said: 'Yeah. Yeah, I do'.

The singer had to tone down some of the suggestive lyrics to please the officers at Disney, the producers of Dick Tracy, who were worried about their image. In Ireland, the song was subject to controversy after two women's organizations accused Madonna of glorifying violence against women, specifically with the line "I'll settle for the back of your hand"; the National Women's Council of Ireland, labelled the song "highly dangerous" while the other group, Ireland's Women's Aid, said the line was "extremely harmful". Although initially approving of the idea of "getting spanked" — even admitting her fondness on The Arsenio Hall Show — Madonna later backed down from the theme of spanking, explaining that the lyrics were written as a joke and believed that it was instead her character Breathless Mahoney that liked to get spanked. She added that it should have been obvious that the song was humorous in nature since Madonna believed her image was more of a dominant person who took charge, contrary to the song's characterization.

== Critical response ==
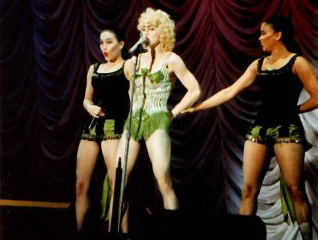
Madonna and her backup singers, Donna De Lory (left) and Niki Haris (right), perform "Hanky Panky" during the Blond Ambition World Tour of 1990

J. Randy Taraborrelli, author of Madonna: An Intimate Biography, commented that "the steamrolling 'Hanky Panky' simply sounds like a silly innocent romp until you realize what she's going on and on is about ('Warren's favorite pastime')... being spanked!". The author also felt Madonna sang with "just a little too much authority". Academic Georges Claude Guilbert, author of Madonna As Postmodern Myth, called it "a comic hymn to spanking". Stephen Thomas Erlewine from AllMusic described it as a "double entendre-laden hit". Bill Coleman from Billboard magazine called it a "steamy and suggestive jumpin' jive". Music critic Robert Christgau highlighted "Hanky Panky" as one of the best tracks on I'm Breathless; calling it a "fake period piece" but praising its "risqué s&m-lite" sound as "all her". Ernest Hardy from Cash Box said it "is a tribute to the pleasures of light S&M, done in a brassy '30s style. Madonna sings in a lower key than usual, tosses off risque lines, and heads for the top of the charts with barely an effort." David Giles from Music Week stated that it "finds Madonna flirting in a big way with Forties swing music." He added, "Pure Hollywood stuff". Rolling Stone's Mark Coleman wrote that the song, alongside "Cry Baby" and "I'm Going Bananas", was one of the "more-legitimate sounding and confidently sung show tunes without a trace of disco" on the album. He also noted that "its titles alone are enough to conjure up visions of the elaborate production numbers on Madonna's summer tour." People magazine called it a "paean to kink". Billboard's Keith Caulfield called it "goofy (but catchy!)". In March 2023, Joel Lynch from the same magazine ranked it as the singer's 100th greatest song, calling it an "enjoyably (and cartoonishly) amorous big-band swing song" and comparing Madonna's vocals to Betty Boop. Greg Sandow, from Entertainment Weekly, called it a "delightful challenge to censorship". Sal Cinquemani from Slant Magazine felt it was a "cheeky" song, also writing that it touched on themes Madonna would go on to explore more explicitly later in the 1990s.

Stephen Holden of The New York Times described it as a "big-band blues [song] in which she endorses sexual spanking [...] a calculated bid for outrage". Ray Boren from The Deseret News described "Hanky Panky" as "naughty", comparing it to the 1928 jazz song "Makin' Whoopee" by Eddie Cantor. Dave Tianen from The Milwaukee Sentinel, while reviewing I'm Breathless noted that "one aspect of Madonna remains constant even when you push her back in time. 'Hanky Panky' is one of the few pop tunes to explore the erotic entertainment value in a good spanking." For Medium's Richard LaBeau, "it gets points for its boldness and audacity. Yet it never truly rises above its novelty status". Writing for The Pittsburgh Press, Peter B. King believed that the subject matter of "Hanky Panky" would surely receive "flank", but defended Madonna saying that she had been singing about such topics for years by then. In The Huffington Post, drag queen Pandora Boxx ranked the song fifth on her list of "The 13 Most Underrated Madonna Songs," hailing it as "a great fusion of '90s pop and vintage '30s", but noted that "its 'scandalous' subject matter ruffled too many feathers to make it a big hit". Also from The Huffington Post, Matthew Jacobs ranked it at number 55 on his list of "The Definitive Ranking of Madonna Singles", calling it "pure fun, '30s swing style [...] its lyrics are sillier than they ought to be, but the fabulous beat refuses to let your dancing shoes collect dust". Writing for Gay Star News, Joe Morgan gave a mixed review, calling it "less sexual and feminist liberation and more corny and blatant [...] A forgettable number that sounds like track six of a musical theatre cast album". A negative review came from Royal S. Brown, author of Film Musings: A Selected Anthology from Fanfare Magazine, who called it "ridiculous". Also negative was The Guardian's Jude Rogers, who wrote that "even creators of brilliant pop can go wrong", calling it "over farty" and "Madonna's nadir".

== Chart performance ==
Following its release, "Hanky Panky" was initially blacklisted at some radio stations when they faced objections from audiences about the lyrical content. Nevertheless, it debuted on the Billboard Hot 100 at number 40 the week of June 30, 1990, as "Vogue" was descending from the top ten. The single quickly climbed up the chart, ultimately peaking at number ten the week of July 28, 1990. It became Madonna's 20th single to reach the Top 10, making her the first female artist to have this many Top 10 hits at the time. It was eventually certified gold by the Recording Industry Association of America (RIAA) on September 19, 1990, for shipments of 500,000 copies. Billboard ranked it at number 36 on their list of "Madonna's 40 Biggest Hits" on the Hot 100. In Canada, the song debuted at number 92 on the RPM Top Singles chart, and reached a peak of number 18 on the week of September 1, 1990. It was present for a total of 13 weeks on the chart.

In the United Kingdom, the song debuted at number 14 on the UK Singles Chart and after two weeks, reached its peak of number two the week of July 27, 1990; spent a total of nine weeks within the top 100 of the chart. It was certified silver by the British Phonographic Industry (BPI) on August 1, 1990, for shipments of 200,000 copies. According to the Official Charts Company, the single has sold over 210,000 copies as of October 2010. In Australia, "Hanky Panky" debuted at number 18 on the ARIA Singles Chart the week of July 29, 1990, and peaked at number six four weeks later. It was ranked at number 45 on the ARIA year-end chart. In New Zealand, the single debuted at number 23 on RIANZ Singles Chart and, after fluctuating for the next three weeks, reached a peak of number six, becoming Madonna's 18th top-ten single in the country. In the European nations, "Hanky Panky" reached the top-ten of the charts in Ireland, as well as topping the charts in Finland. In other countries such as Austria, Belgium, Germany, Spain, Switzerland and the Netherlands, it managed to peak within the top 20 of the charts.

== Live performances and covers ==
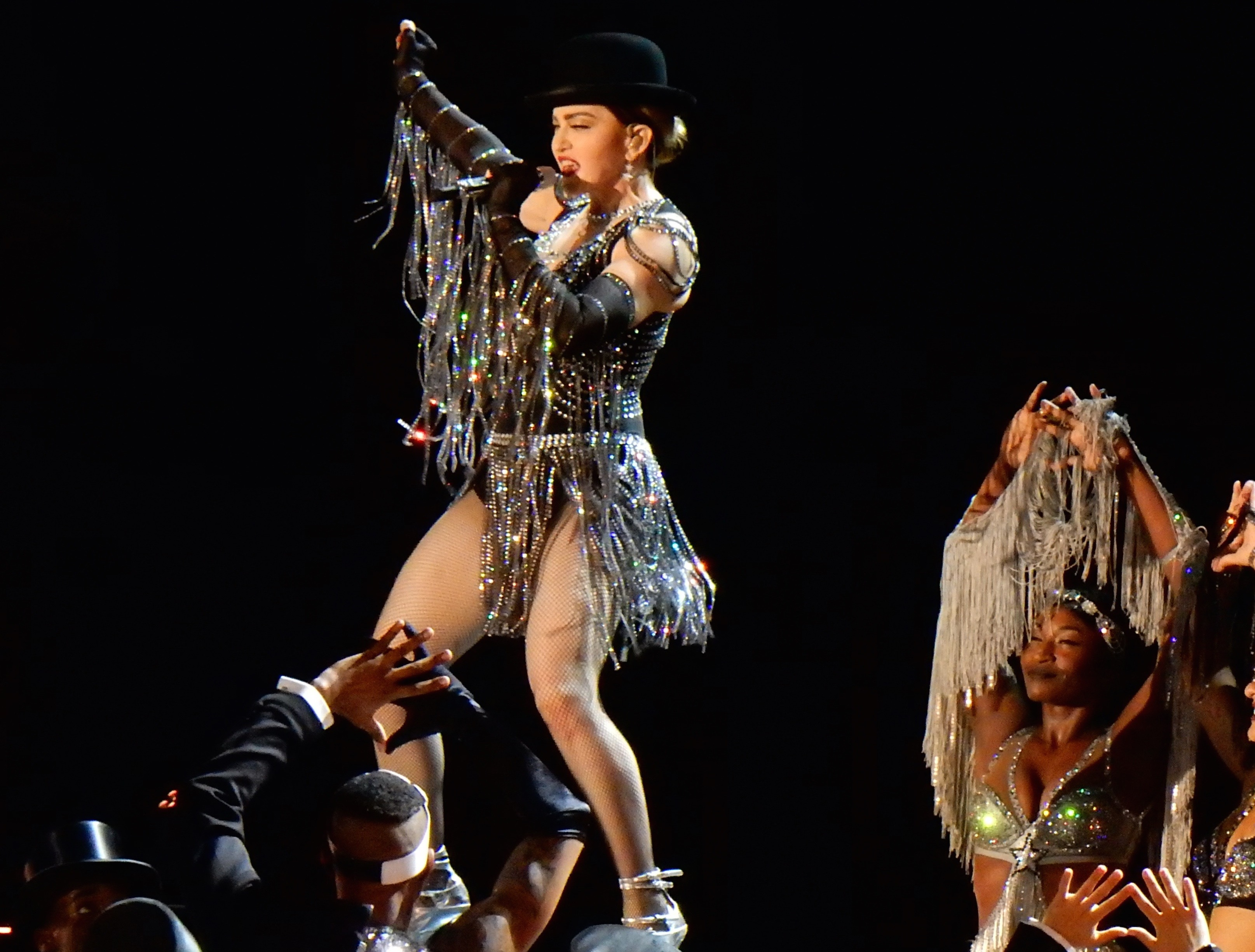
Madonna performing "Hanky Panky" on the final concert of 2015-2016's Rebel Heart Tour in Sydney

"Hanky Panky" was first performed on Madonna's third concert tour, the Blond Ambition World Tour of 1990. She performed the song dressed in a green and white striped vaudeville-style corset, playing the part of a nightclub singer, standing in front of a microphone. Near the end of the performance, Madonna joked: "You all know the pleasures of a good spanking, don't you? [...] When I hurt people, I feel better, you know what I mean?". Regarding the "shameless promotion" of Dick Tracy in this segment, author Lucy O'Brien said that "along with her yen for artistic expression, Madonna has always had an eye on the bottom dollar... [But] the Dick Tracy section is the least dynamic part of the show". Two different performances were released on video, the first was included in Blond Ambition Japan Tour 90, taped from the performance at Yokohama Stadium in Yokohama, Japan, on April 27, 1990, and the other one included on Blond Ambition World Tour Live, taped at the Stade de l'Ouest in Nice, France, on August 5, 1990.

Fourteen years later, Madonna performed an energetic showgirl themed version of "Hanky Panky" as part of her 2004 Re-Invention World Tour. She appeared onstage dressed in a circus themed outfit, consisting of black hot pants, red high heels, headband and a red and white striped 1920s flapper style bustier. Sean Piccoli, from the Sun-Sentinel, praised the singer's ability to "summon the vampy humor of 'Hanky Panky'—a Bette Midler moment if ever [Madonna] had one". Despite not being part of the official set list, Madonna sang "Hanky Panky" on the final concert of her Rebel Heart Tour, held in Sydney, Australia in March 2016. In May 2000, the song was performed by actress Alicia Witt on the third-season finale of the American television series Ally McBeal, titled "The Musical, Almost". An Indie cover version by the band Killer Nannies In America, was included on the 2000 tribute album The Material Girl: A Tribute to Madonna. The Gary Tesca Orchestra included an instrumental version of the song on their album Who's That Girl: The Madonna Story, Vol. 1 (2006).

== Track listings and formats ==
- US and European 7-inch single; Japanese 3-inch CD single
1. "Hanky Panky" (LP version) – 3:57
2. "More" (LP version) – 4:59
- Australian, European, and US 12-inch single and CD maxi-single
1. "Hanky Panky" (Bare Bottom 12-inch mix) – 6:34
2. "Hanky Panky" (Bare Bones single mix) – 3:50
3. "More" (album version) – 4:59
- Digital single (2020)
1. "Hanky Panky" (Bare Bones single mix) – 3:50
2. "Hanky Panky" (Bare Bottom 12-inch mix) – 6:36
3. "More" (LP version) – 4:59

== Credits and personnel ==
Credits are adapted from the album's liner notes.

- Madonna – writer, vocals, producer
- Patrick Leonard – writer, producer, keyboard
- Jeff Porcaro – drums
- Guy Pratt – bass
- Donna De Lory – background vocals
- Niki Haris – background vocals
- N'Dea Davenport – background vocals
- Kevin McGuilbert – remix and additional production
- Patrick Demarchelier – cover photographer
- Jeri Heiden – designer

== Charts ==
=== Weekly charts ===
Weekly chart performance for "Hanky Panky"
Chart (1990)	Peak position
Australia (ARIA)	6
Austria (Ö3 Austria Top 40)	20
Belgium (Ultratop 50 Flanders)	15
Canada Retail Singles (The Record)	2
Canada Top Singles (RPM)	18
Canada Contemporary Hit Radio (The Record)	3
European Airplay Top 50 (Music & Media)	1
European Hot 100 Singles (Music & Media)	4
Finland (Suomen virallinen lista)	1
Germany (GfK)	21
Ireland (IRMA)	3
Italy (Musica e dischi)	4
Italy Airplay (Music & Media)	9
Luxembourg (Radio Luxembourg)	2
Netherlands (Dutch Top 40)	13
Netherlands (Single Top 100)	21
New Zealand (Recorded Music NZ)	6
Spain (PROMUSICAE)	13
Switzerland (Schweizer Hitparade)	15
UK Singles (Official Charts)	2
US Billboard Hot 100	10
US Dance Singles Sales (Billboard)	9
US Cash Box Top 100	8
US Radio & Records CHR & Pop Charts	10

=== Year-end charts ===
Year-end chart performance for "Hanky Panky"
Chart (1990)	Position
Australia (ARIA)	45
European Airplay Top 50 (Music & Media)	24
European Hot 100 Singles (Music & Media)	89
Spain (PROMUSICAE)	90

== Certifications and sales ==
Certifications and sales for "Hanky Panky"
Region	Certification	Certified units/sales
Australia (ARIA)	Gold	35,000^{^}
United Kingdom (BPI)	Silver	210,000
United States (RIAA)	Gold	500,000^{^}
^{^} Shipments figures based on certification alone.

== See also ==
- List of European number-one airplay songs of the 1990s

== Bibliography ==
- Brown, Royal S. (2007). Film Musings: A Selected Anthology from Fanfare Magazine. Rowman & Littlefield. ISBN 978-0-8108-5856-5.
- Guilbert, Georges-Claude (2002). Madonna As Postmodern Myth. McFarland. ISBN 0-7864-1408-1.
- Morton, Andrew (2002). Madonna. Macmillan Publishers. ISBN 0-312-98310-7.
- Nyman, Jake (2005). Suomi soi 4: Suuri suomalainen listakirja (in Finnish). Helsinki: Tammi Publishers. ISBN 951-31-2503-3.
- O'Brien, Lucy (2008). Madonna: Like an Icon. Bantam Press. ISBN 9780552153614.
- Rooksby, Rikky (2004). The Complete Guide to the Music of Madonna. Omnibus Press. ISBN 0-7119-9883-3.
- Salaverri, Fernando (2005). Sólo éxitos: año a año, 1959–2002 (in Spanish). Fundación Autor-SGAE. ISBN 84-8048-639-2.
- Taraborrelli, Randy J. (2008). Madonna: An Intimate Biography. Simon & Schuster. ISBN 9780330454469.
