= List of European number-one hits of 1990 =

This is a list of the European Music & Media magazine's European Hot 100 Singles and European Top 100 Albums number-ones of 1990.

Date	Song	Artist	Album	Artist
6 January	"Another Day in Paradise"	Phil Collins	...But Seriously	Phil Collins
13 January	"Another Day in Paradise"	Phil Collins	...But Seriously	Phil Collins
20 January	"Another Day in Paradise"	Phil Collins	...But Seriously	Phil Collins
27 January	"Another Day in Paradise"	Phil Collins	...But Seriously	Phil Collins
3 February	"Another Day in Paradise"	Phil Collins	...But Seriously	Phil Collins
10 February	"Get Up (Before the Night Is Over)"	Technotronic featuring Ya Kid K	...But Seriously	Phil Collins
17 February	"Get Up (Before the Night Is Over)"	Technotronic featuring Ya Kid K	...But Seriously	Phil Collins
24 February	"Nothing Compares 2 U"	Sinéad O'Connor	...But Seriously	Phil Collins
3 March	"Nothing Compares 2 U"	Sinéad O'Connor	...But Seriously	Phil Collins
10 March	"Nothing Compares 2 U"	Sinéad O'Connor	...But Seriously	Phil Collins
17 March	"Nothing Compares 2 U"	Sinéad O'Connor	...But Seriously	Phil Collins
24 March	"Nothing Compares 2 U"	Sinéad O'Connor	...But Seriously	Phil Collins
31 March	"The Power"	Snap!	...But Seriously	Phil Collins
7 April	"The Power"	Snap!	...But Seriously	Phil Collins
14 April	"The Power"	Snap!	I Do Not Want What I Haven't Got	Sinéad O'Connor
21 April	"Vogue"	Madonna	I Do Not Want What I Haven't Got	Sinéad O'Connor
28 April	"Vogue"	Madonna	...But Seriously	Phil Collins
5 May	"Vogue"	Madonna	I Do Not Want What I Haven't Got	Sinéad O'Connor
12 May	"Vogue"	Madonna	I Do Not Want What I Haven't Got	Sinéad O'Connor
19 May	"Vogue"	Madonna	I Do Not Want What I Haven't Got	Sinéad O'Connor
26 May	"Vogue"	Madonna	I Do Not Want What I Haven't Got	Sinéad O'Connor
2 June	"Vogue"	Madonna	I Do Not Want What I Haven't Got	Sinéad O'Connor
9 June	"Vogue"	Madonna	I Do Not Want What I Haven't Got	Sinéad O'Connor
16 June	"Sacrifice"	Elton John	I'm Breathless	Madonna
23 June	"Sacrifice"	Elton John	I'm Breathless	Madonna
30 June	"Sacrifice"	Elton John	I'm Breathless	Madonna
7 July	"Sacrifice"	Elton John	Step by Step	New Kids On The Block
14 July	"Sacrifice"	Elton John	Step by Step	New Kids On The Block
21 July	"Sacrifice"	Elton John	Step by Step	New Kids On The Block
28 July	"Sacrifice"	Elton John	Step by Step	New Kids On The Block
4 August	"U Can't Touch This"	MC Hammer	Step by Step	New Kids On The Block
11 August	"U Can't Touch This"	MC Hammer	Step by Step	New Kids On The Block
18 August	"U Can't Touch This"	MC Hammer	Step by Step	New Kids On The Block
25 August	"U Can't Touch This"	MC Hammer	Step by Step	New Kids On The Block
1 September	"U Can't Touch This"	MC Hammer	Pretty Woman (Soundtrack)	Various Artists
8 September	"U Can't Touch This"	MC Hammer	Pretty Woman (Soundtrack)	Various Artists
15 September	"U Can't Touch This"	MC Hammer	The Three Tenors In Concert	Carreras/Domingo/Pavarotti with Mehta
22 September	"U Can't Touch This"	MC Hammer	The Three Tenors In Concert	Carreras/Domingo/Pavarotti with Mehta
29 September	"U Can't Touch This"	MC Hammer	The Three Tenors In Concert	Carreras/Domingo/Pavarotti with Mehta
6 October	"I've Been Thinking About You"	Londonbeat	The Three Tenors In Concert	Carreras/Domingo/Pavarotti with Mehta
13 October	"I've Been Thinking About You"	Londonbeat	The Three Tenors In Concert	Carreras/Domingo/Pavarotti with Mehta
20 October	"I've Been Thinking About You"	Londonbeat	The Three Tenors In Concert	Carreras/Domingo/Pavarotti with Mehta
27 October	"I've Been Thinking About You"	Londonbeat	The Three Tenors In Concert	Carreras/Domingo/Pavarotti with Mehta
3 November	"I've Been Thinking About You"	Londonbeat	The Three Tenors In Concert	Carreras/Domingo/Pavarotti with Mehta
10 November	"I've Been Thinking About You"	Londonbeat	The Three Tenors In Concert	Carreras/Domingo/Pavarotti with Mehta
17 November	"I've Been Thinking About You"	Londonbeat	The Three Tenors In Concert	Carreras/Domingo/Pavarotti with Mehta
24 November	"I've Been Thinking About You"	Londonbeat	The Rhythm of the Saints	Paul Simon
1 December	"Ice Ice Baby"	Vanilla Ice	Serious Hits...Live!	Phil Collins
8 December	"Ice Ice Baby"	Vanilla Ice	Serious Hits...Live!	Phil Collins
15 December	"Ice Ice Baby"	Vanilla Ice	The Very Best of Elton John	Elton John
22 December	"Ice Ice Baby"	Vanilla Ice	The Very Best of Elton John	Elton John
29 December	"Ice Ice Baby"	Vanilla Ice	The Very Best of Elton John	Elton John
