= The Top 10 of Everything =

Top 10 of Everything is an internationally distributed illustrated reference book of quantifiable Top 10 lists on a diverse variety of subjects, written by Russell Ash until his death in 2010, by Alexander and Caroline Ash from 2010-present, and Paul Terry (2014 'Top 10 for Boys') and published annually since 1989. Facts and statistics about animals, geography, music, films, business, transport, sport and many other subjects are presented. The lists – totalling 700 or more in each volume – often also provide supplementary data about entries outside the Top 10 as well as additional information. Top 10 of Everything focuses on practical facts and occasional offbeat entries, from the most densely populated countries and the most expensive paintings to the tallest skyscrapers and the most common names around the world. The latest UK edition is the first to include a DVD featuring an interactive quiz based on the book.

Formerly published by Dorling Kindersley, Top 10 of Everything has been published by Hamlyn since 2006 and in other English-language editions. It also appears in a number of translations including, to date, Czech, Danish, Dutch, Estonian, Finnish, French, German, Greek, Hungarian, Icelandic, Gujarati, Japanese, Norwegian, Polish, Slovak and Swedish.

Top 10 of Everything was the basis of a children’s TV series broadcast on ITV in 1998–2001. Related books including The Top 10 of Sport, The Top 10 of Music, The Top 10 of Film, Top 10 for Men, Top 10 of Britain and (forthcoming) Top 10 of Football and Top 10 of Ireland. Quiz books, calendars, diaries and other products, have been also issued at intervals.

== Current editions ==
- Top 10 of everything 2013 (2014)
- Top 10 of Everything 2010 (2009) ISBN 978-0-600-61742-6 (UK)
- Top 10 of Everything 2010 (2009) ISBN 978-0-600-62048-8 (US)
- Top 10 (2009) ISBN 978-2-7000-2734-1 (France)

== Related books ==
- Top 10 for Men (2008) ISBN 978-0-600-61817-1
- Top 10 of Britain (2009) ISBN 978-0-600-61921-5
- Top 10 for Men USA (2010) ISBN 978-0-600-62070-9
- Top 10 for Boys (2014) ISBN 978-0-600-62345-8
