= Unendlich (Matthias Reim album) =

Studio album by Matthias Reim
- Released: 2013
- Label: Electrola

Matthias Reim chronology
| Sieben Leben Live (2011) | Unendlich (2013) |

Unendlich is a 2013 album by German pop singer Matthias Reim. The album had a long gestation of over two years.

Reim's 12th album signalled an unexpected - even for the singer - return to popularity. The long delayed album went immediately to No.1 on the German album charts, his first No.1 since his No.1 debut 23 years earlier.

== Charts ==
=== Weekly charts ===
| Chart (2013) | Peak position |
|---|---|
| Austrian Albums (Ö3 Austria) | 9 |
| German Albums (Offizielle Top 100) | 1 |
| Swiss Albums (Schweizer Hitparade) | 28 |

=== Year-end charts ===
| Chart (2013) | Position |
|---|---|
| German Albums (Offizielle Top 100) | 36 |
