= Russell Ash =

British writer (1946-2010)

- Born: Russell Ash; 18 June 1946; Surrey, England, United Kingdom
- Died: 21 June 2010 (aged 64); Lewes, East Sussex
- Education: St Cuthbert's Society, Durham
- Occupation: Author
- Spouse: Caroline
- Children: Three
- Writing career
- Notable work: The Top 10 of Everything

Russell Ash (18 June 1946 – 21 June 2010) was the British author of the Top 10 of Everything series of books, as well as Great Wonders of the World, Incredible Comparisons and many other reference, art and humour titles, most notably his series of books on strange-but-true names, Potty, Fartwell & Knob, Busty, Slag and Nob End and (for children) Big Pants, Burpy and Bumface. Once described as 'the human Google', his obituary in The Times stated that 'In the age of the internet, it takes tenacity and idiosyncratic intelligence to make a living from purveying trivial information. Russell Ash did just that'.

== Biography ==
Russell Ash was born in Surrey, a descendant of a family of craftsmen – goldsmiths and silversmiths in 18th-century London that included Claudius Ash (1792–1854), one of the pioneering inventors of false teeth. His father worked as a bookbinder for the British Museum Library and also served in the RAF in the Second World War.

The family moved to Bedford, where he attended primary school and Bedford Modern School. He studied anthropology and geography at St Cuthbert's Society, Durham University, and began a publishing career in 1967. He worked as a picture researcher for Man, Myth & Magic and a researcher/writer for Reader's Digest Books and as European Correspondent for Newsweek Books on their Wonders of Man series.

In 1973, with his friend Ian Grant, Ash established the publishing company Ash & Grant, that ran for five years. He was also a director of Weidenfeld & Nicolson in 1980–83, where he worked with authors including the comedian Barry Humphries (Dame Edna Everage), and Pavilion Books in 1984–88, where he published works by satirist John Wells, Hockney Posters and numerous other illustrated books. However, his principal occupation was freelance author, having written or contributed to over a hundred non-fiction books. He married Caroline Ash, a fundraiser with the Malaria Consortium, and had a daughter and two sons.

== Death ==
He lived in Lewes, East Sussex, from 1991 until his death from a heart attack.

== Work ==
Russell Ash wrote for adults and children on various subjects, including reference, art, history, biography and humour. 'Top 10 of Everything', probably his best-known work, has been published annually since 1989 and was the basis of a children's TV series broadcast on ITV in 1998–2001. Related books – The Top 10 of Sport, The Top 10 of Music, The Top 10 of Film, Top 10 for Men, Top 10 of Britain and others – have been issued at intervals. Formerly published by Dorling Kindersley, Top 10 of Everything has been published by Hamlyn since 2006 and also appears in a number of translations.

The art books Ash wrote during the 1990s include titles on the Pre-Raphaelites, the Impressionists and their contemporaries: Sir Lawrence Alma-Tadema, Henri de Toulouse-Lautrec, James Tissot, Sir Edward Burne-Jones, Dante Gabriel Rossetti, Lord Leighton and Sir John Everett Millais.

He compiled a range of Illustrated reference books for Dorling Kindersley, including Incredible Comparisons (1996), The World in One Day (1997), The Factastic Book of 1001 Lists (1998), Factastic Millennium Facts (1999) and Great Wonders of the World (2000), all of which were published internationally in numerous editions.

He was the co-author (with Brian Lake) of Fish Who Answer the Telephone and Other Bizarre Books (2006). Among his other publications are Whitaker's World of Facts (annual 2005–; published in North America as Firefly's World of Facts), Potty, Fartwell & Knob: Extraordinary but True Names of British People (2007; expanded paperback 2008; US edition as Morecock, Fartwell, & Hoare, 2009), Busty, Slag and Nob End (2009) and Big Pants, Burpy and Bumface (2009).

He was a contributor to a number of annual publications, including Whitaker's Almanack and Children's Writers' & Artists' Yearbook and an occasional journalist, who contributed articles to various British national newspapers.

On 7 April 2008, he took part in BBC2's University Challenge: The Professionals, in the team representing the Society of Authors, which also comprised Antony Beevor (captain), Katie Fforde and Anna Claybourne.

== Bibliography ==
=== Art ===
- Alma-Tadema (1973) ISBN 978-0-85263-237-6
- Alma-Tadema (catalogue of the Funt Collection) (1973)
- Victorian Studio Photographs (with Bevis Hillier et al.) (1975) ISBN 978-0-904069-03-7
- The Impressionists and their Art (1980) ISBN 978-0-85613-292-6
- Selections from the Reader's Digest Collection (1986)
- Sir Lawrence Alma-Tadema (1989) ISBN 978-1-85145-422-8
- Toulouse-Lautrec: The Complete Posters (1991) ISBN 978-1-85145-517-1
- The Impressionists’ River (1992) ISBN 978-1-85145-512-6
- Van Gogh's Provence (1992) ISBN 978-1-85145-507-2
- James Tissot (1992) ISBN 978-1-85145-741-0
- Sir Edward Burne-Jones (1993) ISBN 978-1-85793-017-7
- Dante Gabriel Rossetti (1995) ISBN 978-1-85793-412-0
- Impressionists' Seasons (1995) ISBN 978-1-85793-628-5
- Lord Leighton (1995) ISBN 978-1-85793-732-9
- Sir John Everett Millais (1996) ISBN 978-1-85793-792-3
- Victorian Masters and their Art (1999) ISBN 978-1-86205-304-5

=== Biography and history ===
- Highwaymen (1970) ISBN 978-0-85263-101-0
- Britain's Buried Treasures (1972) ISBN 978-0-903356-17-6
- Wrecks & Sunken Treasure (1972) ISBN 978-0-903356-04-6
- Comets (with Ian Grant) (1973) ISBN 978-0-904069-00-6
- The Wright Brothers (1974) ISBN 978-0-85340-342-5
- Dear Cats: The Post Office Letters (1986) ISBN 978-1-85145-085-5
- Highwaymen (revised edition) (1994) ISBN 978-0-7478-0260-0
- Great Wonders of the World (2000) ISBN 978-0-7513-2886-8

=== Humour ===
- Dead Funny (with Ian Grant) (1974) ISBN 978-0-904069-02-0
- The Cynic's Dictionary (1984) ISBN 978-0-552-99052-3
- The Official British Yuppie Handbook (1984) ISBN 978-0-906710-56-2
- Last Laughs (with Ian Grant) (1984) ISBN 978-0-04-827123-5
- Bizarre Books (with Brian Lake) (1985) ISBN 978-0-333-38312-4
- Howlers (1985) ISBN 978-0-906710-73-9
- They Didn't Really Mean It (1987) ISBN 978-0-552-13319-7
- I'll Drink to That (1987, with Bernard Higton) ISBN 978-0-552-13318-0
- Private Parts (1987, with Bernard Higton) ISBN 978-0-552-13317-3
- The Uncensored Boy's Own (1990, as 'Dick Beresford') ISBN 978-0-356-19508-7
- The Uncensored Guide to the Movies (1991, as 'Dick Beresford') ISBN 978-0-356-20306-5
- Henry & Caroline at Home (with Joanna Isles) (1990) ISBN 978-1-85145-358-0
- Tall Stories (1994) ISBN 978-1-85410-335-2
- Bizarre Books (with Brian Lake; new edition) (1998) ISBN 978-1-86205-102-7
- Fish Who Answer the Telephone and other Bizarre Books (with Brian Lake) (2006) ISBN 978-0-7195-6018-7
- Potty, Fartwell & Knob (2007) ISBN 978-0-7553-1654-0; expanded paperback (2008) ISBN 978-0-7553-1655-7; US (as Morecock, Fartwell, & Hoare) (2009) ISBN 978-0-312-54535-2
- Busty, Slag and Nob End (2009) ISBN 978-0-7553-1870-4
- Big Pants, Burpy and Bumface (2009) ISBN 978-0-385-61723-9
- It Just Slipped Out... A Bulging Encyclopedia of double entendres (2010) ISBN 978-0-7553-6086-4.

=== Literature and language ===
- The Vampyre: A Tale by John William Polidori (introduction) (1974) ISBN 978-0-85263-244-4
- Edward Lear's Book of Nonsense (introduction) (1980) ISBN 978-0-460-04499-8
- Alice's Adventures Under Ground (Lewis Carroll; introduction) (1985) ISBN 978-0-907516-94-1
- The Life and Times of Paddington Bear (with Michael Bond) (1988) ISBN 978-1-85145-286-6
- Larkrise to Candleford Diary (1989)
- A Dictionary of RAF Slang (Eric Partridge; introduction) (1990) ISBN 978-1-85145-526-3

=== Reference and trivia ===
- Fact or Fiction? (1973) ISBN 978-0-276-00043-0
- Talking about the Family (1973) ISBN 978-0-85340-266-4
- Talking about Race (1974) ISBN 978-0-85340-356-2
- The Pig Book (1985) ISBN 978-0-85223-417-4
- The Londoner's Almanac (1985) ISBN 978-0-7126-0928-9
- The Frog Book (1986) ISBN 978-0-356-12305-9
- The Daily Trivia Diary '87 (1986)
- Top 10 of Everything (annual; 1989–2009) ISBN 978-0-600-61742-6 (UK); ISBN 978-0-600-62048-8 (US) (latest edition)
- The Top 10 of Sport (with Ian Morrison) (1992) ISBN 978-0-7472-0714-6
- The Top 10 of Music (with Luke Crampton and Barry Lazell) (1993) ISBN 978-0-7472-0798-6
- Top 10 Quiz Book (1996) ISBN 978-0-7513-5443-0
- Incredible Comparisons (1996) ISBN 978-0-7513-5421-8
- Crucial Top 10 (1997) ISBN 978-1-86208-214-4
- The World in One Day (1997) ISBN 978-0-7513-5618-2
- Factastic Book of 1001 Lists (1998) ISBN 978-0-7513-5799-8
- Factastic Book of Comparisons (1999) ISBN 978-0-7513-6208-4
- Factastic Millennium Facts (1999) ISBN 978-0-7513-5663-2
- The Top 10 of Sport (with Ian Morrison; new edition) (2002) ISBN 978-0-7513-4642-8
- The Top 10 of Film (2003) ISBN 978-1-4053-0050-6
- Whitaker's World of Facts (annual; 2005–2008) ISBN 978-1-4081-1506-0 (UK); US (as Firefly's Book of Facts) ISBN 978-1-55407-499-0 (latest edition)
- Top 10 for Men (2008) ISBN 978-0-600-61817-1
- Top 10 of Britain (2009) ISBN 978-0-600-61921-5
- Top 10 of Football (with Ian Morrison) (2010) ISBN 978-0-600-62067-9

== See also ==
- List of non-fiction writers
