= Kurt Suttner =

German music teacher and choir director (born 1936)

- Born: August 8, 1936 (age 90)

Academic work
- Discipline: Musicology

Kurt Suttner (born 8 August 1936 in Regensburg) is a German music teacher and choir director. He is the founder of the Via Nova Choir, with which he was awarded at numerous international competitions.

== Career ==
Born in Regensburg, Suttner studied music and voice at the Hochschule für Musik München. While still a student, he was a co-founder of Konrad Ruhland's Capella antiqua. Following his training, he initially worked as a music teacher at various schools in Munich. Later he became a music teacher at the German School in the Ethiopian capital Addis Ababa and worked as a music consultant at the Ministry of Culture of the Republic of Madagascar.

After his return to Germany he became a lecturer for choral conducting at the Hochschule für Musik München, from 1967 to 1968 and again from 1972 to 1974. In 1975 he was appointed to the Chair of Music Education at the University of Augsburg, which he held until 1998. He made numerous international concert tours with the chamber choir of the university. From 1989 to 1999 Suttner was also director of the Bayerische Singakademie (Bavarian Academy of Singing), devoted to training young singers.

=== via-nova-chor München ===
In 1972, he founded in Munich the via-nova-chor München, focussed on the performance of contemporary choral music. He formed the amateur choir to a professional ensemble. In close contact with composers such as Peter Michael Hamel, Robert Helmschrott, Max Beckschäfer, Moritz Eggert, Kay Westermann, Killmayer, Harald Genzmer and Günter Bialas, the choir created numerous choral works in first performances and premieres. They won awards and accolades at several international competitions, including the Kulturpreis der Bayerischen Landesstiftung (Cultural Award of the Bavarian State Foundation), the grant from the Ernst von Siemens Music Foundation, prizes in international choral competitions in Tours, The Hague, Cork, Budapest, Tolosa, and the special prize for contemporary choral music in the Deutscher Chorwettbewerb (German Choir Competition) in Fulda. In early 2008, he handed over the direction of the choir to Florian Helgath.

== Awards ==
- 1998: Order of Merit of the Federal Republic of Germany
- 2006: Medal "München leuchtet"
- 2007: Orlando-di-Lasso-Medaille of the Bayerischer Sängerbund
- 2007: Bayerischer Verdienstorden
