= Konrad Ruhland =

German musicologist

Konrad Ruhland (19 February 1932 – 14 March 2010) was a German musicologist.

== Biography ==
Ruhland was born in 1932 in Landau am Isar, which, at the time, was a part of the Weimar Republic.

He studied history, medieval Latin, theology, and liturgical history, which helped him gain extensive background knowledge for his musicological research. Under the Ruhland's leadership, a group of enthusiastic students in Munich formed a "Capella Antiqua" in 1956: known as the Capella Antiqua Munchen, this group was one of the first to tackle the problems of reviving Early Baroque and Renaissance music using a scholarly approach.

Until his death, Ruhland continued to communicate his theoretical knowledge and practical experience to students in numerous courses, music weeks and summer schools, including the summer school at the University of Pennsylvania. He was also a much sought-after choir director and had extensive experience in this field.

== Discography ==
- Paschale Mysterium
