= Verdammt, ich lieb' dich =

1990 single by Matthias Reim

Single by Matthias Reim

from the album Reim
- Language: German
- English title: "Damn, I Love You"
- B-side: "Maskenball"
- Released: 1990
- Length: 3:40 (single version)
- Label: Polydor
- Songwriters: Bernd Dietrich, Matthias Reim
- Producers: Bernd Dietrich, Matthias Reim

Matthias Reim singles chronology
"Verdammt, ich lieb' dich" (1990)	"Ich hab' geträumt von dir" (1990)

"Verdammt, ich lieb' dich" (English: "Damn, I Love You") is a song by the German singer Matthias Reim from his first album, Reim. The song was Reim's first single and remains his biggest hit, reaching number one in West Germany, Austria, Belgium, the Netherlands, and Switzerland. In West Germany, it spent 16 consecutive weeks atop the Media Control chart, ending 1990 as the country's best-selling hit.

Reim also recorded cover versions in other languages, including English ("I Think I Love You"), French ("Et puis je t'aime (bien quand même)"), Italian ("Perché ti amo") and Spanish ("Tal vez te quiero"). In 2021, Reim recorded a new English version with actor David Hasselhoff.

== Charts ==
=== Weekly charts ===
Chart (1990)	Peak position
Austria (Ö3 Austria Top 40)	1
Belgium (Ultratop 50 Flanders)	1
Netherlands (Dutch Top 40)	1
Netherlands (Single Top 100)	1
Switzerland (Schweizer Hitparade)	1
West Germany (GfK)	1

=== Year-end charts ===
Chart (1990)	Position
Austria (Ö3 Austria Top 40)	1
Belgium (Ultratop)	8
Germany (Media Control)	1
Netherlands (Dutch Top 40)	9
Netherlands (Single Top 100)	6
Switzerland (Schweizer Hitparade)	2

=== Decade-end charts ===
Chart (1990–1999)	Position
Austria (Ö3 Austria Top 40)	30

== Certifications ==
Region	Certification	Certified units/sales
Austria (IFPI Austria)	Platinum	50,000^{*}
Belgium (BRMA)	Gold	25,000^{*}
Germany (BVMI)	Platinum	500,000^{^}
Netherlands (NVPI)	Gold	75,000^{^}
^{*} Sales figures based on certification alone.^{^} Shipments figures based on certification alone.
