= Matthias Reim =

German singer (born 1957)

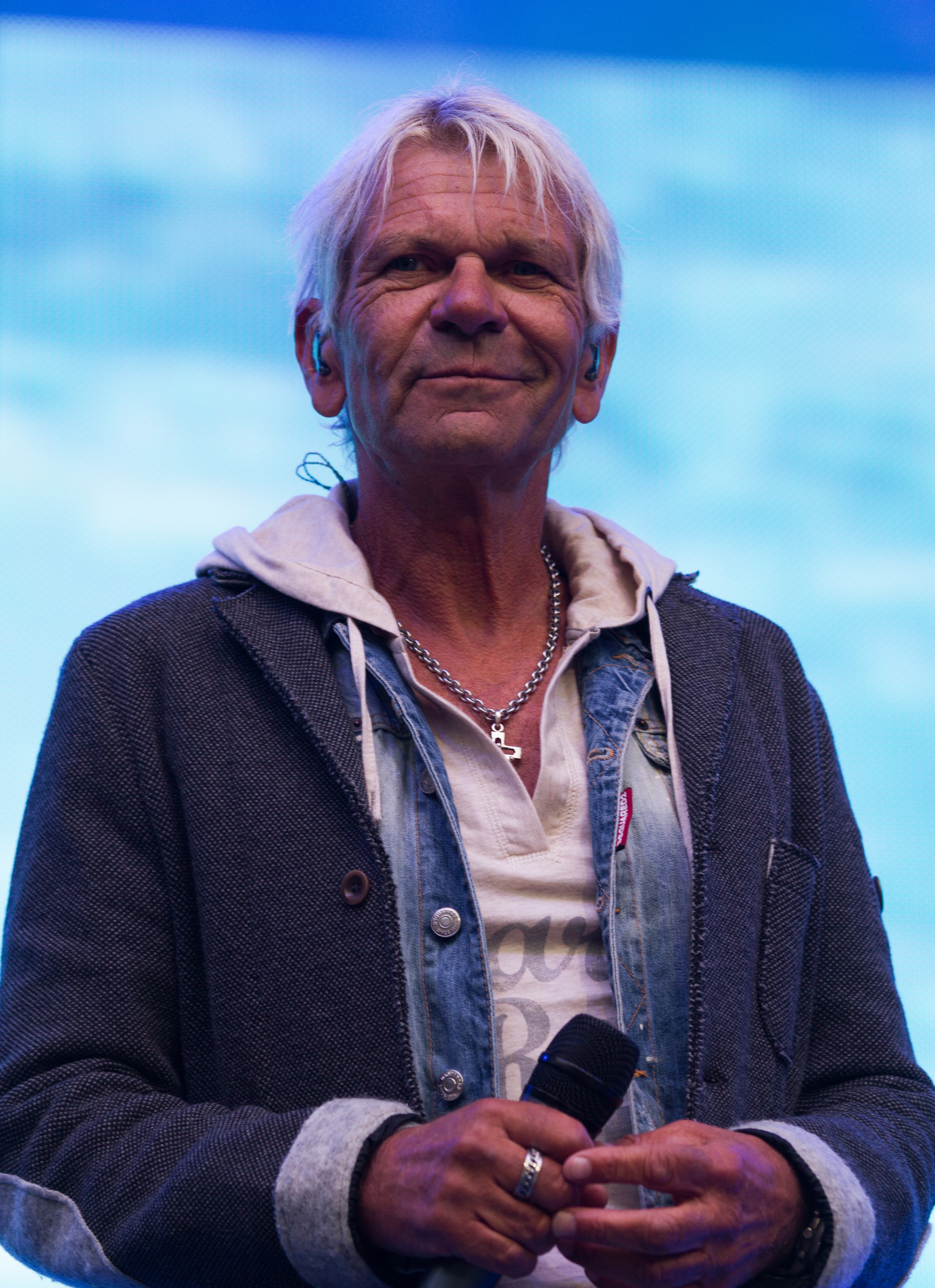
- Reim in 2015

Background information
- Born: 26 November 1957 (age 68); Korbach, West Germany
- Genres: Schlager, pop, rock
- Occupations: Singer, songwriter, composer
- Years active: 1977–present
- Labels: Polydor, EMI
- Spouse: Miriam (m. 1985; div. 1992) Margot Scheuermeyer (m. 1990; div. 1998) Sarah Stanek (m. 2004; div. 2013) Christin Stark (m. 2020)
- Partner: Michelle (1999-2001)

Matthias Reim (born 26 November 1957) is a German pop and Schlager singer. His 1990 single "Verdammt, ich lieb' dich" ("Damn, I love you") was a hit in several European countries and spent 16 consecutive weeks at the number 1 spot in the German charts. He unexpectedly returned 23 years later to the top on the charts with "Unendlich" in 2013.

== Early life ==
Reim was born on 26 November 1957 in Korbach and grew up in Homberg. His father was the director of the gymnasium in Homberg. After receiving his Abitur, he began his undergraduate studies in the German and English languages as well as Germanistic and Anglistic literatures in Göttingen. This took 18 terms – this is above average, as he spent time predominantly in the music studio and not in the lecture-room.

== Career ==
=== 1980–1989: Fallen Dice and Fair Fax ===
Reim's career began as a songwriter, writing for Bernhard Brink, Roberto Blanco and Tina York. He played in a rock band called Fallen Dice with Pete Goldenberg and Norbert Preis. Their debut album, Pasch 1, was released in 1981. He spent a brief time as lead singer of the band Aqua before their dissolution in 1984. In 1986, Reim formed the synthpop duo Fair Fax with Jörg Wiesner. They released one single, "Satellite Dream", through Hansa Records.

=== 1990–1999: Solo career ===
Reim's debut single "Verdammt, ich lieb' dich" ("Damn, I love you") topped the German Singles Chart for sixteen consecutive weeks in 1990. It also reached no. 1 in Austria, Belgium, the Netherlands and Switzerland. His debut album, Reim, was released through Polydor on 15 June 1990. He released a further nine albums through Polydor, including 1994's Zauberland which was re-recorded in English the following year. In 1991, he won a World Music Award for Best-Selling German Recording Artist.

=== 2000–2015: The Electrola years ===
Reim began to see increased commercial success again in the 2000s after signing with Electrola.

In September 2004, Reim released the single "Vergiß Es (Forget It)" with Bonnie Tyler. It featured on Reim's compilation album, Déjà Vu, and reached no. 64 on the German Singles Chart. They recorded a second duet on Reim's thirteenth album, Sieben Leben (2010).

In 2011, Reim released a Christmas album titled Die große Weihnachtsparty, which includes a German cover of "Last Christmas" by Wham!.

In 2013, Reim topped the German Albums Chart for a second time with Unendlich.

=== 2016–present: Recent work ===
Reim moved to RCA Records in 2016 for the release of his sixteenth album, Phoenix, which peaked at no. 2 in Germany. His subsequent albums Meteor (2018), MR20 (2019) and Matthias (2022) all peaked within the top 3.

In 2022, Reim wrote the song "Bastian [Blaulicht in der Nacht]" in memory of his son Bastian, who died in October 2022 at the age of 35. Reim also sang the song "Vater und Sohn" in duet with his son Julian (born 1996), a German adaptation of Cat Stevens' song Father and Son.

== Personal life ==
Reim has been married four times and has seven children from six different mothers. In 1973, at the age of 15-16, he fathered a daughter, Claudia, of whose existence he only learned in 2015.

Reim married his first wife, Miriam in 1985. They had a son, Bastian, born 1987, who died in 2022 at age 35; and divorced in 1992. After his divorce, Reim married Margot Scheuermeyer, a stylist and background singer, whom he had met in 1990, they were married for eight years. They had a son, Julian, born in 1996, who became a Schlager singer.

Between 1999 and 2001, Reim lived together with Michelle. They had a daughter, Marie, born in 2000, also a Schlager singer.

In 2004, Reim married Sarah Stanek, 20 years his junior. They had a son Romeo (born 2004) and a daughter Romy (born 2008) together, before divorcing in 2013. In 2020, Reim married Christin Stark, a Schlager singer and moderator 32 years his junior, they had been living together since 2012. Their daughter Zoe was born in 2022.

Until April 2012, Reim lived on Mallorca, since then he has been living in the Lake Constance area, first in Radolfzell. After the end of his third marriage, he and Christin Stark lived together in Bodman-Ludwigshafen, following their marriage, they moved to Stockach.

== Discography ==
=== Albums ===
Year	Details	Peak chart position				Certifications (sales thresholds)
Year	Details	GER	AUT	NL	SWI	Certifications (sales thresholds)
1990	Reim: Released: 15 June 1990; Label: Polydor	1	1	30	1	BVMI: 3× Platinum; IFPI AUT: Gold; IFPI SWI: Platinum
1991	Reim 2: Released: 23 September 1991; Label: Polydor	5	6	—	8	BVMI: Platinum; IFPI AUT: Gold; IFPI SWI: Platinum
1993	Sabotage: Released: 10 May 1993; Label: Polydor	11	—	—	15	
1994	Zauberland: Released: 19 September 1994; Label: Polydor	26	—	—	47	
1995	Alles klar: Released: 29 September 1995; Label: Polydor	—	—	—	—	
1997	Reim 3: Released: 17 March 1997; Label: Polydor	40	—	—	—	
1998	Sensationell: Released: 20 April 1998; Label: Polydor	51	—	—	—	
2000	Wolkenreiter: Released: 26 May 2000; Label: Electrola	33	—	—	—	
2002	Morgenrot: Released: 22 February 2002; Label: Electrola	16	52	—	74	
2003	Reim: Released: 15 August 2003; Label: Electrola	4	19	—	44	BVMI: Gold
2005	Unverwundbar: Released: 16 September 2005; Label: Electrola	7	32	—	—	BVMI: Gold
2007	Männer sind Krieger: Released: 11 May 2007; Label: Electrola	10	38	—	—	
2010	Sieben Leben: Released: 29 October 2010; Label: Electrola	5	17	—	56	BVMI: Gold
2013	Unendlich: Released: 25 January 2013; Label: Electrola	1	9	—	28	BVMI: Platinum
2014	Die Leichtigkeit des Seins: Released: 2 May 2014; Label: Electrola	2	11	—	34	BVMI: Gold
2016	Phoenix: Released: 15 April 2016; Label: RCA	2	10	—	16	BVMI: Gold
2018	Meteor: Released: 23 March 2018; Label: RCA	3	12	—	19	
2019	MR20: Released: 25 October 2019; Label: RCA	3	15	—	22	BVMI: Gold
2022	Matthias: Released: 14 January 2022; Label: RCA	2	5	—	6	
2024	Zeppelin: Released: 26 April 2024; Label: RCA	4	5	—	11	
2026	Flashback: Released: 18 September 2026; Label: Hansa	3	8	—	13	
"—" denotes a recording that did not chart or was not released in that territory.
