= Enigma discography =

This is the discography of the German musical project Enigma.

Note: all albums were released on Virgin Records or its subsidiary Virgin Schallplatten GmbH. The Eurochart singles top and Eurochart albums top are compiled by the trade magazine Music & Media (a subsidiary of Billboard magazine) and are based on the sales charts of 16 European countries. (countries list). US Top data: for singles from the Billboard Hot 100, for albums from the Billboard 200;

The Enigma project has sold over 70 million records worldwide.

== Albums ==
=== Studio albums ===
Title	Album details	Peak chart positions										Certifications
Title	Album details	GER	AUS	AUT	FRA	NLD	NOR	SWE	SWI	UK	US	Certifications
MCMXC a.D.	Released: 10 December 1990; Label: Virgin (EMI); Formats: CD, Cassette, Vinyl, SACD	3	2	3	1	7	4	3	2	1	6	GER: 2× Platinum; AUS: 2× Platinum; AUT: Gold; FRA: 2× Gold; SWE: Gold; SWI: 2× Platinum; UK: 3× Platinum; US: 4× Platinum
The Cross of Changes	Released: 6 December 1993; Label: Virgin (EMI); Formats: CD, Cassette, Vinyl	5	2	5	9	7	5	3	4	1	9	GER: Platinum; AUS: Platinum; AUT: Gold; FRA: Gold; SWE: Gold; SWI: Platinum; UK: 2× Platinum; US: 2× Platinum
Le Roi Est Mort, Vive Le Roi!	Released: 20 November 1996; Label: Virgin (EMI); Formats: CD, Cassette	3	10	4	8	6	1	8	4	12	25	GER: Gold; AUS: Gold; AUT: Gold; FRA: Gold; SWI: Gold; UK: Gold; US: Platinum
The Screen Behind the Mirror	Released: 14 January 2000; Label: Virgin (EMI); Formats: CD, Cassette	2	44	6	16	4	2	7	4	7	33	GER: Gold; SWE: Gold; SWI: Gold; UK: Gold; US: Gold
Voyageur	Released: 30 September 2003; Label: Virgin (EMI); Formats: CD, Cassette	6	—	19	32	13	—	31	29	46	94	
A Posteriori	Released: 22 September 2006; Label: Virgin (EMI); Formats: CD	16	—	17	98	8	—	—	24	115	95	
Seven Lives Many Faces	Released: 19 September 2008; Label: Virgin (EMI); Formats: CD	15	—	30	93	22	—	—	18	116	92	
The Fall of a Rebel Angel	Released: 11 November 2016; Label: Island (Universal); Formats: CD, vinyl	10	73	24	71	29	—	—	19	40	122	
"—" denotes releases that did not chart or were not released.

=== Compilation albums ===
Title	Album details	Peak chart positions										Certifications	Sales
Title	Album details	GER	AUS	AUT	FRA	NLD	NOR	SWE	SWI	UK	US	Certifications	Sales
Love Sensuality Devotion: The Greatest Hits	Released: 8 October 2001; Label: Virgin (EMI); Formats: CD	4	49	10	11	10	6	11	13	29	29	GER: Gold; UK: Gold	US: 700,000

=== Remix albums ===
- Love Sensuality Devotion: The Remix Collection (2001)

=== Box sets ===
- Trilogy (1998), UK: Silver
- 15 Years After (2005)
- The Platinum Collection (2009)
- Enigma: Classic Album Selection (A box set featuring the first five albums) (2013)

== Extended plays ==
- Eppur si muove (2006)

== Singles ==
Title	Year	Peak chart positions										Certifications	Album
Title	Year	GER	AUS	AUT	FRA	NLD	NOR	SWE	SWI	UK	US	Certifications	Album
"Sadeness (Part I)"	1990	1	2	1	1	1	1	1	1	1	5	GER: Platinum; AUS: Gold; AUT: Gold; FRA: Gold; UK: Silver; US: Gold	MCMXC a.D.
"Mea Culpa (Part II)"	1991	7	55	21	4	11	—	20	10	55	—	FRA: Silver	MCMXC a.D.
"Principles of Lust"	1991	90	111	—	29	—	—	—	—	59	—		MCMXC a.D.
"The Rivers of Belief"	1991	—	160	—	—	—	—	37	—	68	—		MCMXC a.D.
"Carly's Song" (only US and AUS)	1993	—	91	—	—	—	—	—	—	—	—		Music from the Motion Picture Sliver
"Return to Innocence"	1993	5	16	4	11	8	1	1	5	3	4	GER: Gold; UK: Gold; US: Gold	The Cross of Changes
"The Eyes of Truth"	1994	—	71	—	—	31	—	34	—	21	—		The Cross of Changes
"Age of Loneliness"	1994	—	84	—	—	40	—	—	—	21	—		The Cross of Changes
"Out from the Deep"	1994	—	109	—	—	—	—	—	—	—	—		The Cross of Changes
"Beyond the Invisible"	1996	40	57	20	32	27	13	29	36	26	81		Le Roi Est Mort, Vive Le Roi!
"T.N.T. for the Brain"	1997	—	—	—	—	—	—	—	—	60	—		Le Roi Est Mort, Vive Le Roi!
"Gravity of Love"	1999	65	—	—	—	84	—	—	89	—	—		The Screen Behind the Mirror
"Push the Limits"	2000	96	—	—	—	—	—	—	—	76	—		The Screen Behind the Mirror
"Turn Around"	2001	65	—	—	—	—	—	—	45	—	—		Love Sensuality Devotion: The Greatest Hits
"Voyageur"	2003	—	—	—	—	—	—	—	—	—	—		Voyageur
"Following the Sun"	2003	97	—	—	—	—	—	—	—	—	—		Voyageur
"Boum-Boum"	2004	98	—	—	—	—	—	—	—	108	—		Voyageur
"Hello and Welcome"	2006	87	—	—	—	—	—	—	—	—	—		15 Years After
"Goodbye Milky Way"	2006	—	—	—	—	—	—	—	—	—	—		A Posteriori
"Seven Lives / La Puerta Del Cielo"	2008	56	—	—	—	—	—	—	—	—	—		Seven Lives Many Faces
"The Same Parents"	2008	—	—	—	—	—	—	—	—	—	—		Seven Lives Many Faces
"MMX (The Social Song)"	2010	—	—	—	—	—	—	—	—	—	—		Non-album single
"Sadeness (Part II)"	2016	—	—	—	—	—	—	—	—	—	—		The Fall of a Rebel Angel
"Amen"	2016	—	—	—	—	—	—	—	—	—	—		The Fall of a Rebel Angel
"—" denotes releases that did not chart

== DVDs ==
- Remember the Future (2001)
- MCMXC a.D.: The Complete Video Album (2003)
- MCMXC a.D.: The Complete Video Album / Remember the Future box set (2004)
- A posteriori (2006)
- Seven Lives Many Faces (2008)

== Other miscellaneous releases ==
- In the Beginning... (1997) – (promotional compilation CD)
- The Dusted Variations (2005) – bonus disc of Enigma covers, included in 15 Years After
- A Posteriori (Private Lounge Remixes) (2007) – several remixes based on tracks from A Posteriori, exclusive to iTunes
