= Love Sensuality Devotion: The Remix Collection =

Remix album by Enigma
- Released: 8 October 2001
- Recorded: 2001
- Studio: A.R.T. (Ibiza, Spain)
- Genre: Dance
- Length: 57:56
- Label: Virgin
- Producer: Michael Cretu

Enigma chronology
Love Sensuality Devotion: The Greatest Hits (2001)	Love Sensuality Devotion: The Remix Collection (2001)	Voyageur (2003)

Professional ratings
Review scores
Source	Rating
AllMusic	4.5/5 stars

Love Sensuality Devotion: The Remix Collection is a remix album by the German musical project Enigma, released on 8 October 2001 by Virgin Records. All of the remixes on the album were taken from previously released singles. Virgin Records reissued the album in the United States on 26 December 2006.

== Track listing ==
No.	Title	Music	Length
1.	"Turn Around" (Northern Lights Club Mix)	Michael Cretu; Jens Gad	10:27
2.	"Age of Loneliness" (Enigmatic Club Mix)	Curly M.C.	6:14
3.	"Push the Limits" (ATB Remix)	Cretu; Gad	7:51
4.	"Gravity of Love" (Judgement Day Club Mix)	Cretu	5:59
5.	"Return to Innocence" (380 Midnight Mix)	Curly	5:42
6.	"Sadeness (Part I)" (Violent U.S. Remix)	Curly; F. Gregorian; David Fairstein	4:43
7.	"Principles of Lust" (Everlasting Lust Mix)	Curly	4:56
8.	"Mea Culpa" (Fading Shades Mix)	Curly; Fairstein	6:04
9.	"T.N.T. for the Brain" (Midnight Man Mix)	Curly	5:56

== Charts ==
2001 chart performance for Love Sensuality Devotion: The Remix Collection
Chart (2001)	Peak position
Hungarian Albums (MAHASZ)	37

2007 chart performance for Love Sensuality Devotion: The Remix Collection
Chart (2007)	Peak position
US Top Dance/Electronic Albums (Billboard)	20
