= The Dusted Variations =

Studio album by Rollo Armstrong
- Released: December 9, 2005 (Germany); December 12, 2005 (Europe)
- Recorded: Ark Recording Studios
- Genre: Ambient
- Length: 52:15
- Label: Virgin Records
- Producer: Rollo Armstrong; Mark Bates

The Dusted Variations is a set of songs from the musical project Enigma covered by Rollo Armstrong. It is the sixth disc from Enigma's 15 Years After box set, labeled as a bonus disc and also includes the radio edit of "Hello and Welcome".

With the exception of the opening track, the album is composed of covers done by Rollo in an ambient and minimalist style. The only instruments used in the songs are violins, pianos, drums, bell-like instruments, guitars, and some synths. The songs were mixed by Rollo, Mark Bates, and Grippa. The slow style of Rollo's covers raised the ire of some Enigma fans.

Before the disc's track list was confirmed, there were plenty of alterations, with some songs being switched for another. In the end although "Endless Quest" was listed in the track list, the song was actually "Principles of Lust".

== Track listing ==
No.	Title	Length
1.	"Hello and Welcome"	3:55
2.	"The Child in Us"	4:17
3.	"Age of Loneliness"	5:23
4.	"The Eyes of Truth"	9:01
5.	"The Rivers of Belief"	6:56
6.	"Endless Quest"	5:28
7.	"Sadeness (Part I)"	7:34
8.	"Voyageur"	1:41
9.	"Beyond the Invisible"	4:39
