= Love Sensuality Devotion: The Greatest Hits =

Greatest hits album by Enigma
- Released: 8 October 2001
- Recorded: 1990–2001
- Studios: A.R.T. (Ibiza, Spain)
- Genres: New-age; ambient
- Length: 76:29
- Label: Virgin
- Producer: Michael Cretu

Enigma chronology
The Screen Behind the Mirror (2000)	Love Sensuality Devotion: The Greatest Hits (2001)	Love Sensuality Devotion: The Remix Collection (2001)

Professional ratings
Review scores
Source	Rating
AllMusic	4.5/5 stars
Slant Magazine	3.5/5 stars

Love Sensuality Devotion: The Greatest Hits is a greatest hits album by the German musical project Enigma, released on 8 October 2001 by Virgin Records. The album, along with Love Sensuality Devotion: The Remix Collection brings a close to Michael Cretu's first chapter of Enigma.

It contains most of Enigma's singles, and selected album tracks, from 1990 to 2001. Three tracks are from Enigma's debut album, MCMXC a.D. (1990), four tracks are from The Cross of Changes (1993), four tracks are from Le Roi est mort, vive le Roi! (1996), five tracks are from The Screen Behind the Mirror (2000), and the album also features a new single "Turn Around" and its intro "The Landing".

== Track listing ==
1. "The Landing" (Michael Cretu) – 1:04
2. "Turn Around" (Cretu, Jens Gad) – 3:51
3. "Gravity of Love" (Cretu) – 3:59
4. "T.N.T. for the Brain" (Cretu) – 5:18
5. "Modern Crusaders" (Cretu) – 3:53
6. "Shadows in Silence" (Cretu) – 4:19
7. "Return to Innocence" (Curly M.C., Kuo Ying-nan, Kuo Hsiu-chu) – 4:15
8. "I Love You ... I'll Kill You" (Curly, David Fairstein) – 8:01
9. "Principles of Lust" (Curly) – 3:08
10. "Sadeness (Part I)" (Curly, F. Gregorian, Fairstein) – 4:15
11. "Silence Must Be Heard" (Cretu, Gad) – 4:46
12. "Smell of Desire" (Cretu, Fairstein) – 4:32
13. "Mea Culpa" (Curly, Fairstein) – 4:31
14. "Push the Limits" (Cretu, Gad) – 3:48
15. "Beyond the Invisible" (Cretu, Fairstein) – 4:50
16. "Age of Loneliness" (Curly) – 4:10
17. "Morphing Thru Time" (Cretu) – 5:26
18. "The Cross of Changes" (Cretu) – 2:15

== Charts ==
=== Weekly charts ===
Weekly chart performance for Love Sensuality Devotion: The Greatest Hits
Chart (2001)	Peak position
Australian Albums (ARIA)	49
Austrian Albums (Ö3 Austria)	10
Belgian Albums (Ultratop Flanders)	9
Belgian Albums (Ultratop Wallonia)	40
Canadian Albums (Nielsen SoundScan)	24
Danish Albums (Hitlisten)	7
Dutch Albums (Album Top 100)	10
European Albums (Music & Media)	7
German Albums (Offizielle Top 100)	4
Greek International Albums (IFPI)	1
Hungarian Albums (MAHASZ)	12
Irish Albums (IRMA)	47
Italian Albums (FIMI)	19
New Zealand Albums (RMNZ)	5
Norwegian Albums (VG-lista)	6
Portuguese Albums (AFP)	3
Scottish Albums (Official Charts)	39
Spanish Albums (AFYVE)	21
Swedish Albums (Sverigetopplistan)	11
Swiss Albums (Schweizer Hitparade)	13
UK Albums (Official Charts)	29
US Billboard 200	29

=== Year-end charts ===
2001 year-end chart performance for Love Sensuality Devotion: The Greatest Hits
Chart (2001)	Position
Danish Albums (Hitlisten)	95
German Albums (Offizielle Top 100)	82
Swedish Albums (Sverigetopplistan)	95

2002 year-end chart performance for Love Sensuality Devotion: The Greatest Hits
Chart (2002)	Position
Canadian Alternative Albums (Nielsen SoundScan)	114

== Certifications ==
Certifications for Love Sensuality Devotion: The Greatest Hits
Region	Certification	Certified units/sales
Canada (Music Canada)	Gold	50,000^{^}
Germany (BVMI)	Gold	150,000^{^}
New Zealand (RMNZ)	Gold	7,500^{^}
Spain (Promusicae)	Gold	50,000^{^}
United Kingdom (BPI)	Gold	100,000^{^}
^{^} Shipments figures based on certification alone.
