= 15 Years After =

Box set by Enigma
- Released: 9 December 2005
- Recorded: A.R.T. Studios, Ibiza, 1990–2005
- Genres: New age; ambient
- Label: Virgin Schallplatten GmbH
- Producer: Michael Cretu

Enigma chronology
Voyageur (2003)	15 Years After (2005)	A Posteriori (2006)

15 Years After is a box set by the musical project Enigma. It was released by Virgin Germany on 9 December 2005. The box set contains eight discs, five of them original studio albums created from 1990 to 2003, two DVDs, and a bonus CD of Enigma's songs covered by Rollo Armstrong.

As the title suggests, the box set celebrates the fifteen years since the release of Enigma's first single, "Sadeness (Part I)". The album cover was taken from Lady with an Ermine, a 1490 painting by Leonardo da Vinci. The box set packaging and photography was done by Dirk Rudolph, while artwork direction and original designs were created by Johann Zambryski, a long-time designer of Enigma artworks.

Originally, the box set was sold at €128, and this raised a stir with fans of the project, since the discs were not remastered, unlike the compilation album Love Sensuality Devotion: The Greatest Hits but were instead fitted with Copy Control. A new single, "Hello and Welcome" (from the unreleased sixth album A Posteriori) and The Dusted Variations disc also received mixed responses from the fans, who questioned the release of the album.

Additionally, the music video for "Out from the Deep", which was dropped from the Remember the Future DVD without an apparent reason, was still absent in this re-release, and despite the box set being 12-inch vinyl-sized, there was little information about the history of the project within the booklet, apart from credits and a press release inside.

Later on, the price of the box set dropped to €92.99 and on 30 November 2005, the producer and creator of Enigma, Michael Cretu personally visited the EMI factory in Uden, Netherlands to sign a thousand copies of the box set. The thousand signed copies had Cretu's initials ("MC") signed with a silver marker. While signed copies of Enigma's albums are extremely rare, the autographed version of the box set was still available for purchase at Amazon.de half a year after its release. Also within the box set was a code that enabled owners to download the music videos for "Voyageur" and "Boum-Boum" by typing it in a special section within Enigma's official website.

== Contents ==
Albums

- MCMXC a.D. (1990)
- The Cross of Changes (1993)
- Le Roi Est Mort, Vive Le Roi! (1996)
- The Screen Behind the Mirror (2000)
- Voyageur (2003)

Bonus CD

- "Hello and Welcome" and The Dusted Variations

DVDs

- Remember the Future (2001)
- MCMXC a.D.: The Complete Video Album (2003)
