= Eppur si muove (disambiguation) =

Eppur si muove or "And yet it moves" is a phrase purportedly uttered by Galileo Galilei.

Eppur si muove may also refer to:

- Eppur si muove (EP), a 2006 EP by Enigma
- Eppur si muove (album), a 2004 album by Haggard
- "Eppur Si Muove" (The West Wing), a 2004 episode of The West Wing
- "Eppur si muove", a song by Enigma from A Posteriori
- Eppur si muove, a fictionalised biography of Károly Kisfaludy by Mór Jókai
- Eppur Si Muove, a book by Stefan Marinov
- Eppur si muove, a composition for organ by Robert Simpson
- Eppur si muove, a composition for flute by Anatol Vieru
