= Hello and Welcome =

Single by Enigma
- Released: 10 March 2006
- Recorded: 2005
- Studio: A.R.T. Studios, Ibiza
- Genre: Stadium anthem
- Length: 3:39
- Label: Virgin Germany/EMI
- Songwriter: Michael Cretu
- Producer: Michael Cretu

Enigma singles chronology
"Boum-Boum" (2004)	"Hello and Welcome" (2006)	"Eppur Si Muove" (2006)

Music video
- "Enigma - Hello And Welcome (Official Video)" on YouTube

"Hello and Welcome" (titled "Hello + Welcome") is a song created by the musical project Enigma, released on 10 March 2006 (see 2006 in music).

== Overview ==
The vocals in the song are sung by Andru Donalds, who also lent his voice in the fourth and fifth Enigma albums. On its release, listeners thought that, like previous standalone single "Turn Around", the song might not be part of any released album: however, it was later released in September 2006, with a new mix, on A posteriori. The song will also be the walk-in music for the German boxer, Felix Sturm.

According to information provided by Crocodile Music Management, the single was originally scheduled to be released first in October 2005 but the date was moved to 25 November 2005, a day before Sturm's fight with Maselino Masoe for the WBA Championship title. But due to an injury that Sturm picked up just weeks before the fight, the single's release date was pushed further back until 10 March 2006, just a day before Sturm's rescheduled match.

On 7 November 2005, the video to the song was first released for public viewing by Virgin Germany through the German edition of LAUNCHcast. The video features Sturm in training and previous battles with his opponents in the ring. However two days later, Virgin Germany announced that the single will be postponed to a later date and all information about the single, including the music video, were taken off from their websites.

On the release day of the single, the official Enigma website was updated and finally the video was made available streaming through Windows Media Player and RealPlayer.

== Track listing ==
1. "Hello and Welcome" (Radio Edit) – 3:29
2. "Hello and Welcome" (Thunderstorm Mix) – 6:09
3. "Hello and Welcome" (After the Storm Mix) – 6:28
4. "Hello and Welcome" (Video) – 3:20

== Charts ==
The single reached #87 in German charts.
