= Mishale =

1994 single by Andru Donalds

Single by Andru Donalds

from the album Andru Donalds
- B-side: "Cryin' in the Rain"
- Released: 29 September 1994
- Genre: Pop-R&B; reggae
- Length: 4:01
- Label: Metro Blue; Capitol
- Songwriters: Andru Donalds; Eric Foster White
- Producer: Eric Foster White

Andru Donalds singles chronology
| "Mishale" (1994) | "Tryin' To Tell Ya" (1995) |

Music video
- "Mishale" on YouTube

"Mishale" is a song by Jamaican musician Andru Donalds, released as his debut single in September 1994, by labels Metro Blue and Capitol Records. It was written by Donalds and Eric Foster White, who also produced the track. The song was issued as the first single from Donalds' eponymous debut studio album (1994). Described as a pop-R&B song with reggae qualities, "Mishale" experienced success in North America, German-speaking Europe, and New Zealand. On early promotional formats of the single, Donalds was credited as "A. Dee".

== Critical reception ==
US Billboard magazine editor Larry Flick wrote about the single on the issue of 1 October 1994, comparing "Mishale" with songs by Terence Trent D'Arby and Seal but describing it as "far more jubilant and likely to inspire countless hours of jiggling".

== Chart performance ==
"Mishale" debuted at number 92 on the US Billboard Hot 100 in December 1994, rising to its peak of number 38 on 11 February 1995. In Canada, it climbed to number four on the RPM 100 Hit Tracks chart on the issue of 27 February 1995, finishing the year as the country's 27th-best-performing single. It was also successful in German-speaking Europe, peaking at numbers 16, 18, and 13 in Austria, Germany, and Switzerland, respectively. In the latter two countries, the single stayed on the charts for over 30 weeks and finished within the top 30 on the 1995 year-end rankings. "Mishale" was a top-ten hit in New Zealand, reaching number seven for two weeks in April 1995. It was Donalds' only hit single outside German-speaking Europe, where his cover of Air Supply's "All Out of Love" reached the top three.

== Track listings ==
- US cassette single
1. "Mishale" – 4:01
2. "Cryin' in the Rain" – 4:09
- UK and European 12-inch single

A1. "Mishale" (extended pop club mix) – 5:24
A2. "Mishale" (Underground House Love Dub) – 6:49
A3. "Mishale" (R&B mix) – 4:32
B1. "Mishale" (dub culture) – 6:43
B2. "Mishale" (club dub) – 7:14

- Dutch maxi-CD single
1. "Mishale" (single mix) – 4:01
2. "Mishale" (alternative radio mix) – 4:01
3. "Mishale" (Luv Dup's Mekon Mix) – 7:48
- Japanese mini-CD single
1. "Mishale" – 4:01
2. "Ronnie Don't Fall" – 4:47

== Charts ==
=== Weekly charts ===
| Chart (1994–1995) | Peak position |
|---|---|
| Austria (Ö3 Austria Top 40) | 16 |
| Brazil (UPI) | 10 |
| Canada Top Singles (RPM) | 4 |
| Canada Adult Contemporary (RPM) | 8 |
| Europe (Eurochart Hot 100) | 87 |
| Germany (GfK) | 18 |
| Iceland (Íslenski Listinn Topp 40) | 32 |
| New Zealand (Recorded Music NZ) | 7 |
| Switzerland (Schweizer Hitparade) | 13 |
| UK Singles (OCC) | 200 |
| US Billboard Hot 100 | 38 |
| US Adult Contemporary (Billboard) | 33 |
| US Dance Club Play (Billboard) | 29 |
| US Top 40/Mainstream (Billboard) | 21 |
| US Cash Box Top 100 | 28 |

=== Year-end charts ===
| Chart (1995) | Position |
|---|---|
| Brazil (Crowley) | 77 |
| Canada Top Singles (RPM) | 27 |
| Canada Adult Contemporary (RPM) | 65 |
| Germany (Media Control) | 27 |
| Switzerland (Schweizer Hitparade) | 24 |

== Release history ==
| Region | Date | Format(s) | Label(s) | Ref. |
|---|---|---|---|---|
| Europe | 29 September 1994 | CD | Metro Blue; Capitol | |
| Japan | 18 January 1995 | Mini-CD | Metro Blue | |
| Australia | 27 March 1995 | CD; cassette | Capitol; EMI | |
