= JoJo's Bizarre Adventure: Golden Wind =

Fourth season of JoJo's Bizarre Adventure anime

- Season 4
- Key visual from the "Betray the Boss" arc
- No. of episodes: 39

Release
- Original network: Tokyo MX, BS11, MBS
- Original release: Festival debut: July 5, 2018; Season: October 6, 2018 – July 28, 2019

Season chronology
- ← Previous; Season 3: Diamond; Is Unbreakable Next → Season 5: Stone Ocean

JoJo's Bizarre Adventure: Golden Wind (Japanese: ジョジョの奇妙な冒険 黄金の風, Hepburn: JoJo no Kimyō na Bōken Ōgon no Kaze) is the fourth season of the JoJo's Bizarre Adventure anime television series by David Production, adapting Golden Wind, the fifth part of Hirohiko Araki's JoJo's Bizarre Adventure manga. Set in Italy during 2001, two years after the events of Diamond is Unbreakable, the series follows the adventures of Giorno Giovanna, the son of Dio Brando (from Phantom Blood and Stardust Crusaders) albeit conceived with Jonathan Joestar's body, who joins the criminal organization Passione in the hopes of becoming a gangster (or "Gang-Star") and taking control of the organization in the name of reform.

The anime adaptation of Golden Wind was personally announced by series creator Hirohiko Araki at the "Ripples of Adventure" art exhibition on June 21, 2018. Golden Wind is chief directed by returning director Naokatsu Tsuda, who is accompanied by series directors Yasuhiro Kimura and Hideya Takahashi and the senior writer Yasuko Kobayashi. The character designer for Golden Wind is Takahiro Kishida, and the animation director is Shun'ichi Ishimoto. Yugo Kanno returns as composer from previous seasons. The series is 39 episodes long.

The first episode debuted at Anime Expo on July 5, 2018. The series formally aired from October 6, 2018, to July 28, 2019, on Tokyo MX and other channels and was simulcast by Crunchyroll. Like previous seasons, some names are altered in the official English releases to avoid potential trademark infringement. The first opening theme is the 2018 single "Fighting Gold" [02–21] by Coda (Kazusou Oda), and the first ending theme is the 1995 single "Freek'n You" [v1 02–13 _ v2 14–19] by Jodeci. The second opening theme is "Uragirimono no Requiem" [22–39] by Daisuke Hasegawa, and the second ending theme is "Modern Crusaders" [22–37, 39] by Enigma.

On October 4, 2019, Viz Media announced that the anime's English dub would begin broadcasting on Adult Swim's Toonami programming block on October 27, 2019. Toonami's broadcast would go on hiatus after the 28th episode on May 31, 2020, as a result of production delays for the English dub caused by the COVID-19 pandemic. The anime resumed its run on Toonami on August 2 and concluded on October 25, 2020.

== Plot ==
Golden Wind is set in 2001, two years after the events of Diamond is Unbreakable. Koichi Hirose is sent to Italy by Jotaro Kujo in search of Giorno Giovanna, a 15-year-old pickpocket and the illegitimate son of Dio Brando. Giorno's father was possessing the body of Jonathan Joestar at the time of his conception, granting him the morality of the Joestar bloodline. He also wields the Stand Gold Experience, granting him a variety of life-themed abilities including healing and organic transformation.

Upon Koichi's arrival, Giorno steals his luggage and incurs the wrath of a local mafia member who inadvertently kills himself through Gold Experience's abilities. The mafia, Passione, dispatches Bruno Bucciarati to track down Giorno but the two become allies after the latter announces his plan to take over Passione and end the sale of drugs to children. Bucciarati brings Giorno to his capo, an obese man named Polpo, who gives him an initiation task to join Passione. Giorno succeeds, in the process convincing Koichi that his goals are righteous, but also discreetly tricks Polpo into shooting himself in revenge for killing an innocent bystander.

Giorno then joins Bucciarati's team, composed of Leone Abbacchio, Narancia Ghirga, Guido Mista and Pannacotta Fugo. With Polpo's death, they use his hidden fortunes to help Bucciarati succeed him as capo. Passione's anonymous boss assigns them a task – escort his daughter, Trish Una, to him safely – and provide them with a turtle named Coco Jumbo, whose Stand allows them to travel secretly. Team Bucciarati is targeted by La Squadra Esecuzioni, a rogue group of assassins within Passione seeking revenge on the boss.

Giorno and the others successfully escort Trish to the rendezvous whilst fending off La Squadra. However, Bucciarati realises the boss intends to kill Trish to protect his own identity. He rescues Trish, becoming mortally wounded in the process, and the two escape before he succumbs to his injuries. Giorno seemingly manages to revive him using Gold Experience, but in reality, this merely allows Bucciarati's soul to temporarily possess his physically-dead body.

Bucciarati declares their new goal to take down the boss, and Fugo subsequently leaves, believing the mission to be suicidal. They travel to Sardinia, in the hopes of using Abbacchio's Stand to see the boss's face. At Sardinia, they inadvertently interrupt Risotto Nero (the last surviving member of La Squadra) from assassinating the boss's alternate personality, Vinegar Doppio. Doppio kills Abbacchio, but he is able to record the boss's face before dying.

Although the new information seems to be a dead end, Bucciarati's group is contacted by a third party, who reveals the boss's name to be Diavolo and requests that the group visit the Colosseum in Rome to receive a special Arrow. The group arrives in Rome, but Doppio exploits Bucciarati's fading senses to reach the informant first, revealing him to be Jean Pierre Polnareff. Doppio fatally wounds Polnareff, forcing him to stab his Stand Silver Chariot with the Arrow. Doing so evolves the Stand into Chariot Requiem, which goes berserk and uses its ability to swap the souls of living beings across the city.

Polnareff, now within Coco Jumbo's body, explains the Arrow and his Stand to the group, who realize that their own Stands will attack them if they approach the Arrow. They realise that Doppio is within Bucciarati's body and cripple it, but the boss's true personality, Diavolo, has tagged on to Mista's body. As Doppio dies, Diavolo uses his Stand King Crimson to kill Narancia. He goes for the Arrow, but Bucciarati sacrifices himself to destroy Silver Chariot and return everyone to their original bodies. Giorno alone sees Bucciarati's soul ascending to the heavens.

In a final battle, Giorno is stabbed with the Arrow and evolves his Stand into Gold Experience Requiem, easily overpowering King Crimson and condemning Diavolo to an infinite death loop. The surviving members of Team Bucciarati reunite with Polnareff, and Giorno decides to keep the Arrow in memory of his fallen friends. Sometime later, Giorno has taken over Passione, with Mista and Polnareff at his side.

== Cast ==
Character	Japanese	English
Giorno Giovanna	Kenshō Ono	Phillip Reich
Bruno Bucciarati	Yuichi Nakamura	Ray Chase
Guido Mista	Kōsuke Toriumi	Sean Chiplock
Narancia Ghirga	Daiki Yamashita	Kyle McCarley
Leone Abbacchio	Junichi Suwabe	Mick Lauer
Trish Una	Sayaka Senbongi	Lizzie Freeman
Pannacotta Fugo	Junya Enoki	Ezra Weisz (Note: Credited as Ethan Murray.)
Diavolo	Katsuyuki Konishi	Kellen Goff
Vinegar Doppio	Sōma Saitō	Griffin Burns
Jean Pierre Polnareff	Fuminori Komatsu	Doug Erholtz
Polpo	Hideo Ishikawa	Brook Chalmers
Mario Zucchero	Shinya Takahashi	Aleks Le
Sale	Kaito Ishikawa	Alejandro Saab
Pericolo	Shinpachi Tsuji	Leonard Draper
Risotto Nero	Shinshū Fuji	Armen Taylor
Formaggio	Jun Fukushima	Jonah Scott
Illuso	Ken Narita	Ben Lepley
Prosciutto	Tatsuhisa Suzuki	Bill Millsap
Pesci	Subaru Kimura	Joe Hernandez
Melone	Junji Majima	Brian Hanford
Ghiaccio	Nobuhiko Okamoto	Chris Hackney
Squalo	Tomoaki Maeno	Ryan Colt Levy
Tiziano	Kenjiro Tsuda	Jordan Reynolds
Carne	Daisuke Sakaguchi	Jordan Reynolds
Cioccolata	Atsushi Miyauchi	Bill Butts
Secco	Kenn	Erik Kimerer
Scolippi	Kenji Nojima	Daman Mills
Koichi Hirose	Yūki Kaji	Zach Aguilar
Jotaro Kujo	Daisuke Ono	Matthew Mercer
Narrator	Tōru Ōkawa	David Vincent

== Episodes ==
No. overall (Note: Order of episodes in the series continuing from the previous season)	No. in season (Note: Order of episodes within the season)	Title (Note: English episode titles are taken from Crunchyroll. In instances where names are altered from the Japanese version, the original Japanese translation is used on the left while the edited Crunchyroll title is used on the right.)	Storyboarded by	Directed by	Written by	Original release date (Note: Tokyo MX lists the series as premiering at 25:05 on Friday, which is effectively Saturday at 1:05 a.m. JST.)	English air date
114	1	"Gold Experience / Golden Wind"; Transliteration: "Gōrudo Ekusuperiensu" (Japanese: 黄金体験(ゴールド・エクスペリエンス))	Naokatsu Tsuda	Naokatsu Tsuda	Yasuko Kobayashi	July 5, 2018 (festival debut); October 6, 2018	October 27, 2019
In 2001, two years after Yoshikage Kira's defeat, Koichi Hirose arrives in Naples, Italy at the request of Jotaro Kujo to obtain a skin sample from a teenager named Haruno Shiobana. Koichi ends up being scammed by Haruno, who now goes by the name of Giorno Giovanna. While escaping from Koichi, Giorno uses his Stand Gold Experience, (Note: "Golden Wind" in official English releases.) which allows him to transform inanimate objects into living organisms, to transform Koichi's luggage into a frog. Giorno then has an altercation with a gangster named Leaky Eye Luca for operating on his turf. Luca attempts to bash Giorno's head in with a shovel, but instead strikes the frog, which results in Luca taking the damage and being knocked out. Later, Koichi catches up to Giorno and tries to restrain him with his Stand Echoes, (Note: "Reverb" in official English releases.) only for Giorno to escape by using Gold Experience to create a tree that raises him to safety. Koichi reports his findings to Jotaro and learns that Giorno is Dio Brando's son. Jotaro then warns Koichi to stay away from Giorno, as his sudden awakening of a Stand might mean there are other dangerous Stand users in Naples. Giorno boards a cable car and encounters Bruno Bucciarati who suspects Giorno of harming Luca, who was later killed by his boss. Bucciarati brings out the power of his zipper-generating Stand, Sticky Fingers, (Note: "Zipper Man" in official English releases.) to extract the truth from Giorno.
115	2	"Bucciarati Is Coming / Bucciarati Appears"; Transliteration: "Bucharati ga Kuru" (Japanese: ブチャラティが来る)	Hideya Takahashi	Hideya Takahashi	Yasuko Kobayashi	September 25, 2018 (Lumine debut); October 13, 2018	November 3, 2019
In a flashback, it is revealed that Giorno, who was once abused by his step-father and bullied by other children, began being treated with respect after saving an injured gangster, giving him a reason to live. Back in the present, faced with Bucciarati's Stand, Sticky Fingers, Giorno desperately uses Gold Experience to defend himself and learns his Stand can cause a living person's senses to go berserk. Outmatched, Bucciarati creates a dimension-distorting zipper in an attempt to hide himself inside another person, but Giorno tracks him down by turning a tooth he had earlier punched out from Bucciarati's mouth into a fly that attempts to return to his body. Given the chance to finish Bucciarati off, Giorno decides against it and instead asks to join his organization. He reveals his goal to take down the organization's boss and rule over it himself so he may better the lives of the citizens of Naples.
116	3	"Meet the Gangster Behind the Wall / Meet the Mafioso Behind the Wall"; Transliteration: "Hei no Naka no Gyangu ni Ae" (Japanese: 塀の中のギャングに会え)	Yasuhiro Kimura	Yasuhiro Kimura	Shōgo Yasukawa	October 20, 2018	November 10, 2019
Bucciarati agrees to introduce Giorno into the Passione organization, but he has to be evaluated by Polpo, a morbidly obese capo. (Note: Captain in the organization) Giorno visits him in prison and realizes that he is a Stand user. Polpo tasks him with keeping the flame on a cigarette lighter burning for 24 hours as a test of his trust. Giorno arrives back at his dorm with the lighter, but he is forced to evade Koichi, who has come looking for his passport. The lighter is accidentally doused by a janitor who easily reignites the lighter. However, this causes Polpo's Stand Black Sabbath (Note: "Shadow Sabbath" in official English releases.) to appear; it grabs the janitor's soul and pierces it with an arrow to test if it is "worthy". The janitor is killed, and Black Sabbath turns its attention to Giorno.
117	4	"Joining the Gang / Joining the Famiglia"; Transliteration: "Gyangu Nyūmon" (Japanese: ギャング入門)	Yasuhiro Kimura	Kyōhei Suzuki	Shōgo Yasukawa	October 27, 2018	November 17, 2019
After evading Black Sabbath's attacks, Giorno deduces that the Stand attacks those who witness the lighter being relit while staying in the shadows to avoid sunlight. Koichi is also targeted, as he had also witnessed the lighter being relit; he deduces that Black Sabbath is a remote-type Stand while recognizing its arrow as the same type that created his Stand. Black Sabbath traps Giorno by reaching out from within the shadow of a tree; Koichi tries to restrain it by pinning it down, pushing Giorno far enough down to contact the tree's roots. Giorno uses Gold Experience to wither the tree, exposing Black Sabbath to the sunlight and causing it to vanish. The next day, Giorno visits Polpo and is admitted into the Passione. However, angry that Polpo had killed the janitor, Giorno turns one of Polpo's guns into a banana, causing the capo to accidentally kill himself when he tries to eat it. Koichi respects Giorno's wishes not to inform Jotaro of what happened, keeping Giorno's plans secret. Later, Bucciarati takes Giorno to meet the rest of his Stand-wielding team.
118	5	"Find Polpo's Fortune! / Let's Find Polpo's Fortune!"; Transliteration: "Porupo no Isan o Nerae!" (Japanese: ポルポの遺産を狙え！)	Naokatsu Tsuda	Takahiro Kamei	Yasuko Kobayashi	November 3, 2018	November 24, 2019
News of Polpo's apparent suicide reaches many Passione members, along with the suspicion that Bucciarati knows the location of Polpo's hidden fortune. Meanwhile, Giorno is introduced to Bucciarati's group: Leone Abbacchio, Narancia Ghirga, Guido Mista and Pannacotta Fugo. After learning of Polpo's death, Bucciarati takes his team on a yacht to the island of Capri to retrieve Polpo's fortune and attain the rank of capo. Narancia, Mista and Fugo mysteriously vanish, leading Bucciarati to suspect someone has sneaked onto the yacht and is targeting him for the fortune. Giorno deduces that the others are still alive and acts as bait to lure out the enemy Stand, prompting Abbacchio, who initially distrusted Giorno, to bring out his own Stand.
119	6	"Moody Blues' Counterattack / Moody Jazz's Counterattack"; Transliteration: "Mūdī Burūsu no Gyakushū" (Japanese: ムーディー・ブルースの逆襲)	Hideya Takahashi	Yoshiko Mikami	Kazuyuki Fudeyasu	November 10, 2018	December 8, 2019
A flashback details Abbacchio's past. He was once an honest police officer until his career ended when he accepted a bribe from a thug, who then went on to kill Abbacchio's partner. He later joined Passione after being approached by Bucciarati. Back in the present, Abbacchio uses his Stand Moody Blues (Note: "Moody Jazz" in official English releases.) to replay the last five minutes of Narancia's actions. Abbacchio and Bucciarati deduce that the enemy Stand, Soft Machine, (Note: "Tender Machine" in official English releases.) has the power to deflate opponents like balloons and pull them into small spaces. Abbacchio suspects that there is one more mystery behind Soft Machine's power, and allows himself to be captured as well, leaving Bucciarati a trail of blood showing where the Stand user is hiding. Bucciarati floods the yacht and causes it to sink, forcing the Stand user, Mario Zucchero, to emerge. Zucchero is revealed to have been hiding inside a second yacht which he had deflated with his power and laid over the first. Bucciarati incapacitates Zucchero by unzipping his head from his body, rescuing the others in the process.
120	7	"Sex Pistols Appears, Part 1 / Six Bullets Appears, Part 1"; Transliteration: "Sekkusu Pisutoruzu Tōjō Sono Ichi" (Japanese: セックス・ピストルズ登場 その①)	Kyōhei Suzuki	Kyōhei Suzuki	Kazuyuki Fudeyasu	November 17, 2018	December 15, 2019
Bucciarati's gang take some delight in torturing information out of Zucchero despite little success. Abbacchio then uses Moody Blues' replay to discover that Zucchero's partner is already waiting for their boat on Capri. Giorno takes Mista on ahead to the island to find Zucchero's partner before their boat arrives. With help from Giorno, Mista uses the power of his Stand Sex Pistols, (Note: "Six Bullets" in official English releases.) which creates six autonomous bullet-like beings that can redirect Mista's gunshots mid-flight, to locate Zucchero's partner, Sale. Sale escapes to a getaway truck, and Mista grabs on before it drives away.
121	8	"Sex Pistols Appears, Part 2 / Six Bullets Appears, Part 2"; Transliteration: "Sekkusu Pisutoruzu Tōjō Sono Ni" (Japanese: セックス・ピストルズ登場 その②)	Masako One	Shinji Osada	Kazuyuki Fudeyasu	November 24, 2018	January 5, 2020
In a flashback, Mista is shown as a carefree young thug who discovered that bullets fired at him miss completely. Back on the island of Capri, Mista is hanging onto the truck travelling up a mountain and is confronted by Sale and his Stand, Kraft Work. (Note: "Arts & Crafts" in official English releases.) Sale's Stand allows him to affix objects and people in place, which enables him to stop a bullet fired by Mista from penetrating his skull. Mista then uses his Sex Pistols to knock Sale off the truck; however, Sale catches up to Mista and hits him with one of his own bullets. Sale attempts to finish Mista off with one final bullet, but Mista has the Sex Pistols take control of it and split it in two, deflecting a fragment to push the bullet Sale had previously stopped further into his skull. Mista then has the truck driver return him to the Marina where he enters the watch-house with the bleeding Sale. Unaware that Mista has returned to the port, Giorno forces the same truck driver back up the mountain to find Mista.
122	9	"The First Mission from the Boss"; Transliteration: "Bosu Kara no Dai-ichi Shirei" (Japanese: ボスからの第一指令)	Tatsuma Minamikawa	Tatsuma Minamikawa	Shin'ichi Inotsume	December 1, 2018	January 12, 2020
Bucciarati's group are reunited on Capri and are approached by Pericolo, one of Passione's capos disguised as a janitor. Bucciarati hands over the treasure, which was hidden inside a urinal, and Pericolo names Bucciarati a capo in control of Polpo's turf. His first task is to protect Trish Una, daughter of Passione's mysterious boss, from a Hitman Team within the organization that has turned traitor and seeks to learn the boss's identity so they can depose him. Back in Naples, Formaggio, one of the traitors, manages to locate Narancia while he is shopping for supplies. He engages Narancia and concludes that Bucciarati's group must be guarding Trish. Narancia tries to dispose of Formaggio with his miniature airplane Stand Aerosmith, (Note: "Li'l Bomber" in official English releases.) but Formaggio uses his own Stand, Little Feet, (Note: "Tiny Feet" in official English releases.) to shrink himself and hide in Narancia's pocket.
123	10	"Hitman Team"; Transliteration: "Hittoman Chīmu" (Japanese: 暗殺者（ヒットマン）チーム)	Jirō Fujimoto	Jirō Fujimoto	Shin'ichi Inotsume	December 8, 2018	January 19, 2020
Narancia discovers that he is slowly shrinking due to a wound Little Feet had inflicted on him. When Formaggio prevents him from using a public telephone to call Bucciarati's group, Narancia realizes Formaggio is nearby. Narancia uses Aerosmith to relentlessly track Formaggio and forces him down into the sewer. In a flashback to two years earlier, the Hitman Team realized that two of their members, Sorbet and Gelato, were missing after trying to discover the boss's identity. Formaggio found Gelato dead with a note reading "Punishment", and later the Team was anonymously mailed frames holding Sorbet's dismembered remains. The group consequently abandoned their plans for advancement until they learnt of Trish. Back in the present, Formaggio deduces that Aerosmith detects its targets by their CO2 emittance. Formaggio attempts to escape among a group of rats, only to become the target of Aerosmith yet again due to the heavy breathing of the rat he is riding. He survives an attack by reverting to his original size, as Aerosmith has also shrunk along with Narancia and its smaller bullets have little effect.
124	11	"Narancia's Aerosmith / Narancia's Li'l Bomber"; Transliteration: "Narancha no Earosumisu" (Japanese: ナランチャのエアロスミス)	Yoshiko Mikami, Hideya Takahashi	Shinji Osada	Shin'ichi Inotsume	December 15, 2018	January 26, 2020
A flashback shows that after Narancia's mother died from an eye infection, he ran away from home due to his father's neglect. Falling into a bad crowd, he was arrested after his friend framed him, then was abandoned by his friends after being released. He nearly died from the same eye infection that killed his mother, but he was rescued by Fugo and Bucciarati. In the present, Formaggio traps the miniature Narancia in a bottle with a spider to interrogate him on Trish's whereabouts. However, Aerosmith had earlier riddled a car with bullets, and the car suddenly explodes, scorching Formaggio and returning Narancia to his normal size. Formaggio shrinks himself, using his own blood to extinguish the flames engulfing him, and attempts to escape under the smoke affecting Aerosmith's radar. However, Narancia causes more explosions, surrounding Formaggio with more fires and forcing him to reveal himself. The two have one final stand-off, resulting in Narancia killing Formaggio. Back at the vineyard, Bucciarati receives instructions from the boss to travel to Pompeii and retrieve a key near a dog mosaic for a vehicle which can escort Trish to safety.
125	12	"The Second Mission from the Boss"; Transliteration: "Bosu Kara no Daini Shirei" (Japanese: ボスからの第二指令)	Taizō Yoshida	Takahiro Kamei	Shōgo Yasukawa	December 22, 2018	February 2, 2020
Giorno, Fugo, and Abbacchio arrive in Pompeii seeking the key. They come across a strange mirror and Fugo is suddenly dragged into a mirror world by Hitman Team member Illuso and his Stand, Man in the Mirror. (Note: "Mirror Man" in official English releases.) Fugo summons his Stand, Purple Haze, (Note: "Purple Smoke" in official English releases.) but it appears in the real world with Giorno and Abbacchio instead of the mirror world where he is trapped. A flashback explains how Fugo's pent-up rage led to a violent incident that led him to be disowned by his family and for him to eventually join Bucciarati's group. As Purple Haze begins to emit a deadly virus from its fists, Fugo has it smash the mirror as a message for Giorno; Giorno remains determined to save Fugo, despite Abbacchio's command that they find the key and flee.
126	13	"Man in the Mirror and Purple Haze / Mirror Man and Purple Smoke"; Transliteration: "Man in za Mirā to Pāpuru Heizu" (Japanese: マン・イン・ザ・ミラーとパープル・ヘイズ)	Taizō Yoshida	Yasuo Ejima	Shōgo Yasukawa	December 29, 2018	February 9, 2020
Abbacchio attempts to retrieve the key, but Illuso uses a nearby piece of a mirror to draw him into the mirror world. Abbacchio tricks Illuso into taking Moody Blues into the mirror, but Illuso counterattacks, leaving half of Abbacchio and Moody Blues in each world, rendering each powerless. In desperation, Abbacchio cuts off his own hand, enabling Moody Blues' hand to grab and deliver the key to Giorno. However, rather than flee with the key, Giorno allows himself to be dragged into the mirror world by Illuso. Giorno reveals he had infected himself with Purple Haze's virus, and has now passed it on to Illuso. To save himself, Illuso escapes back into the real world, leaving his infected arm in the mirror world. However, Giorno had earlier used Gold Experience to turn a brick into a snake which tracks Illuso's position, enabling Fugo to follow and kill him with Purple Haze. As Illuso dies, Fugo, Abbacchio and Giorno return to the real world, where Giorno uses the snake's antibodies to cure his own infection before tasking Fugo with treating Abbacchio's wounds.
127	14	"Express Train to Florence / Il Treno Espresso per Firenze"; Transliteration: "Firentse Iki Chōtokkyū" (Japanese: フィレンツェ行き超特急)	Takashi Kawabata	Kyōhei Suzuki	Kazuyuki Fudeyasu	January 12, 2019	February 16, 2020
Bucciarati's gang follows the key's instructions to drive to Naples' railway station to find the vehicle it unlocks, and to use the vehicle to bring Trish to Venice. Meanwhile, two members of the Hitman Team, Prosciutto and Pesci, arrive at the station to ambush Bucciarati's squad. Unable to unlock any keyholes he finds at the specified location written on the key, Bucciarati notices a land turtle named Coco Jumbo (Note: "Coco Large" in official English releases.) with a key-shaped indentation in its shell. Bucciarati and his crew board the train with the turtle and insert the key into Coco Jumbo's shell. This activates its Stand ability, Mr. President, which pulls them into a furnished room inside its body. When Prosciutto and Pesci board the train, they are unable to locate the others as Coco Jumbo is hiding under a chair, keeping Bucciarati's crew safe. In order to find them, Prosciutto activates his Stand, The Grateful Dead, (Note: "The Thankful Death" in official English release.) which spreads a gas throughout the train that causes everyone to rapidly age. Although the turtle is barely affected by the gas, Narancia, Abbacchio, Fugo and Giorno quickly age. Giorno notices that Bucciarati, Mista, and Trish are aging slower than the others. Remembering that the others drank cool drinks earlier, he deduces that the aging gas is less effective on those with cooler body temperatures. Mista exits the turtle to find the Stand user, but when he tries to turn on the air conditioning to cool the room, he is immediately hooked by Pesci's fishing rod Stand, Beach Boy, (Note: "Fisher Man" in official English releases.) which was using the machine's button as bait.
128	15	"The Grateful Dead, Part 1 / Thankful Death, Part 1"; Transliteration: "Za Gureitofuru Deddo Sono Ichi" (Japanese: 偉大なる死(ザ・グレイトフル・デッド) その①)	Tatsuma Minamikawa	Tatsuma Minamikawa	Kazuyuki Fudeyasu	January 19, 2019	February 23, 2020
Beach Boy's hook makes its way through Mista's body towards his brain. Mista has Sex Pistols find Pesci and shatter the ice he is using to keep cool and prevent The Grateful Dead's effect. Panicking, Pesci drops his grip on Mista and exposes his location, but a disguised Prosciutto, having aged himself with his Stand, launches a surprise attack on Mista. Prosciutto instantly ages Mista before firing three bullets into his head, leaving him for dead. Prosciutto and Pesci then head to the driver's cabin where they find Coco Jumbo. However, Mista is still alive thanks to his Sex Pistols stopping the bullets from penetrating his skull, and he sends Pistol No. 6 to deliver an ice cube to Bucciarati. This allows Bucciarati to launch a counterattack against Prosciutto; however, Bucciarati's movements warm him up and increase the aging effect. Prosciutto grabs him, but Bucciarati quickly zips open the cabin and drags both himself and Prosciutto off the moving train to protect his crew.
129	16	"The Grateful Dead, Part 2 / Thankful Death, Part 2"; Transliteration: "Za Gureitofuru Deddo Sono Ni" (Japanese: 偉大なる死(ザ・グレイトフル・デッド) その②)	Hiromasa Seki	Ken Takahashi	Yasuko Kobayashi	January 26, 2019	March 1, 2020
Pesci catches Prosciutto with Beach Boy's line, but Bucciarati uses the opportunity to grab onto the line himself and knock Prosciutto off the train. However, Prosciutto survives and gets caught under the train's carriage, causing The Grateful Dead to remain in effect. As Bucciarati makes his way back onboard the train, Pesci becomes emboldened by Prosciutto's sacrifice, shedding his cowardice and becoming ruthless. Pesci has Beach Boy travel through Bucciarati's body in an attempt to pierce his heart. In order to save himself, Bucciarati remains still and uses Sticky Fingers to split himself up into pieces, even splitting his heart in half, so that Pesci can't find him. Giving up on his search, Pesci stops the train, giving Bucciarati time to revive himself and piece himself back together. Bucciarati emerges from the stopped train and faces Pesci; while Pesci nearly manages to pierce Bucciarati's heart, Sticky Fingers grabs Beach Boy's line and uses it to twist Pesci's neck. In his last moments, Pesci attempts to crush Coco Jumbo with the crew still inside, but Bucciarati stops him by unzipping his own arm so it can punch Pesci, then finishes him off by unzipping him into pieces. Prosciutto also succumbs to his wounds and dies, causing everyone to revert to normal. In the aftermath of the fight, Bucciarati discovers that Trish has Stand powers she is unaware of. The team is soon trailed by their next opponent: Melone.
130	17	"Baby Face / Babyhead"; Transliteration: "Beibī Feisu" (Japanese: ベイビィ・フェイス)	Takashi Kawabata, Naokatsu Tsuda	Naokatsu Tsuda, Masakazu Takahashi	Yasuko Kobayashi	February 2, 2019	March 8, 2020
Melone finds a sample of Bucciarati's blood on the train. Using his Stand Baby Face (Note: "Babyhead" in official English releases.) and the genetic information of a woman on the train, he spawns a remote-controlled baby Stand. Bucciarati's crew stop on the roadside and prepare to steal a car while Baby Face Jr. tracks them down on Melone's motorcycle using Bucciarati's DNA. Using its ability to chop up and reconstruct humans, Baby Face Jr. captures Bucciarati and Trish inside Coco Jumbo. To stop Giorno from telling the others, it begins removing parts of Giorno's body. Giorno then uses Gold Experience to replace the missing parts of his body and turns Gold Experience's hand into a piranha which attacks Baby Face Jr. from the inside.
131	18	"Head to Venice! / Verso Venezia"; Transliteration: "Venetsia e Mukae!" (Japanese: ヴェネツィアへ向かえ!)	Yō Nakano, Hideya Takahashi	Yoshihiro Miyajima	Shin'ichi Inotsume	February 9, 2019	March 15, 2020
Giorno tricks Baby Face Jr. into merging with Melone's motorcycle, then uses the spark plug to ignite the gasoline and cause an explosion, destroying him and returning Bucciarati and Trish to normal. Giorno then uses Baby Face Jr.'s components to create a poisonous snake which tracks down and kills Melone. Bucciarati's gang then finds instructions to use Moody Blues to receive the boss's final orders. Moody Blues transforms into Pericolo who, having been speaking to no one, had planned this method to ensure the orders couldn't be intercepted. Pericolo said to recover a data disc at Venice Station which contains further instructions, then killed himself to keep the information secret. Giorno and Mista drive towards Venice while the others remain in Coco Jumbo; however, Ghiaccio, another Hitman Team member, catches up with their car and attacks them using the freezing ability of his Stand White Album. (Note: "White Ice" in official English releases.) They manage to shake him off by combining their Stands' abilities, but Ghiaccio catches up again and uses his Stand as both armor and ice skates. In a desperate move to defeat Ghiaccio, Giorno drives their car into a canal.
132	19	"White Album / White Ice"; Transliteration: "Howaito Arubamu" (Japanese: ホワイト・アルバム)	Taizō Yoshida	Shinji Osada	Shin'ichi Inotsume	February 16, 2019	March 22, 2020
White Album's ice surrounds the car in the canal, but Giorno manages to transform some car parts into grass for Mista to use as a makeshift snowboard. Ghiaccio attempts to stop him by temporarily unfreezing the canal, but Giorno reverts the grass into car parts again so that Mista can fire a metal projectile into Ghiaccio's forehead. However, Ghiaccio's armor is bulletproof, excepting a small breathing hole on the back of his neck. Mista attempts to shoot into the hole, but Ghiaccio uses an ability he calls White Album Gently Weeps to freeze parts of the air solid, causing the bullet to ricochet until eventually hitting Mista's chest. Ghiaccio finds a statue which contains the data disc and shatters it. Giorno inspires Mista to allow himself to be shot by his own ricocheting bullets; this allows him to use his blood to block Ghiaccio's vision and force him onto a broken lamp-post, impaling him through the neck. Ghiaccio attempts to protect himself by freezing his blood while also reflecting a bullet towards Mista's head, but Giorno steps in, immediately heals Mista's wound, and forces Ghiaccio further onto the metal with repeated kicks, killing him. Giorno then heals Mista's injuries.
133	20	"The Final Mission from the Boss"; Transliteration: "Bosu Kara no Saishū Shirei" (Japanese: ボスからの最終指令)	Takahiro Kamei	Takahiro Kamei	Naokatsu Tsuda	February 23, 2019	March 29, 2020
Bucciarati's crew arrives in Venice and read the final mission from the boss on the data disc. The instructions are for only one person to take Trish to the top of the bell tower of the church on the island of San Giorgio Maggiore. Bucciarati takes Trish ashore, but also wears one of Giorno's ladybug brooches as a tracking device while the others wait in their speedboat. Bucciarati and Trish ascend in the tower's elevator, but when they arrive at the top, Bucciarati discovers that Trish has disappeared and that he is only holding her severed hand. Bucciarati has a flashback to his youth when he first joined Passione and realizes that the boss intends to kill his daughter to protect his own identity. Bucciarati follows the boss and manages to attach Giorno's ladybug tracker to him before he disappears. Bucciarati attacks the boss and reconnects Trish's hand, but the boss uses his Stand King Crimson (Note: "Emperor Crimson" in official English releases.) to erase time and effortlessly avoid Bucciarati's attacks. Having appeared behind Bucciarati, King Crimson pushes his fist all the way through Bucciarati's chest in an attempt to kill him.
134	21	"The Mystery of King Crimson / The Mystery of Emperor Crimson"; Transliteration: "Kingu Kurimuzon no Nazo" (Japanese: キング・クリムゾンの謎)	Naokatsu Tsuda, Yasuhiro Kimura	Naokatsu Tsuda, Masakazu Takahashi	Naokatsu Tsuda	March 2, 2019	April 5, 2020
Back on the boat, Bucciarati's crew wait for their leader while Giorno tracks the boss by following the ladybug. However, Giorno realizes that the group is experiencing erased time, with none of them remembering what had happened in between. Meanwhile, inside the church, Bucciarati lies bleeding from King Crimson's attack. Just as the boss is about to kill Trish, he is suddenly encased within a turtle made by Giorno's Gold Experience that replicates Coco Jumbo's Stand ability. Bucciarati drops the turtle through the floor into an underground stream. However, King Crimson quickly reappears and prepares to attack again, but Bucciarati uses his remaining energy to grab Trish and use Sticky Fingers to lift them both to the floor above. Giorno finds them and heals Bucciarati; while Bucciarati's body appears to be deceased for a few seconds, he eventually begins moving again. Giorno signals the others, who arrive before King Crimson can reach Giorno and Bucciarati. The boss determines that he cannot fight them all without revealing his identity and decides to withdraw, allowing them to escape with Trish. On the dock, Bucciarati pierces his hand on a metal spike but doesn't react in pain, confusing Giorno. Bucciarati explains his decision to protect Trish, and gives his crew the choice of following him or the organization. One by one they join him, with the exception of Fugo. Later, a mysterious person orders Squalo, a member of the boss's elite guard squad, over the phone for Bruno Bucciarati and Giorno Giovanna to be taken dead or alive.
135	22	"The 'G' in Guts / The 'G' in Gozzo"; Transliteration: "Gattsu no Jī" (Japanese: ガッツの「G」)	Hideya Takahashi, Jirō Fujimoto	Hikaru Murata	Shōgo Yasukawa	March 16, 2019	April 19, 2020
While Bucciarati's remaining crew stops for lunch, Narancia accidentally splashes red wine onto a man's white suit. When the man demands compensation, the paranoid crew members think he is an enemy and savagely beat him up. Meanwhile, Trish reveals that her father's origins are in Sardinia and they decide to travel there after leaving Venice. While eating, Narancia finds the metallic fish Stand Clash (Note: "Crush" in official English releases.) in his soup; it suddenly attacks him, biting off his tongue and rendering him speechless. He sees that Clash is able to teleport between nearby bodies of liquid, but he is unable to warn the others. After Giorno replaces Narancia's tongue, Narancia starts giving them false information, forced to do so by the Stand Talking Head (Note: "Talking Mouth" in official English releases.) which has latched itself onto the base of his new tongue. The group are observed from afar by Squalo and Tiziano, Clash and Talking Head's respective users and members of the boss's elite guard squad. While the others try to figure out what is happening with Narancia, he directs them into a washroom where he tries to remove all traces of liquid, even his blood, to stop Clash from reappearing. After the others leave the room, Giorno deduces Talking Head's effect on Narancia; however, a leaking pipe enables Clash to emerge from a puddle on the floor and bite Giorno's neck.
136	23	"Clash and Talking Head / Crush and Talking Mouth"; Transliteration: "Kurasshu to Tōkingu Heddo" (Japanese: クラッシュとトーキング・ヘッド)	Jirō Fujimoto	Hitomi Ezoe	Shōgo Yasukawa	March 23, 2019	April 26, 2020
Squalo uses Clash to teleport Giorno to various water sources, making it difficult for Narancia to keep up. Giorno allows Narancia to shoot him with Aerosmith so the gun residue can make it easier to track Clash, allowing Narancia to wound Squalo. Squalo and Tiziano get the upper hand by using Narancia to lead the rest of Bucciarati's crew into a kitchen with a gas leak and forcing Narancia to tell Mista to shoot with Sex Pistols, causing an explosion. Before Clash drags him away again, Giorno instructs Narancia to find the Stand users. With the rest of the crew incapacitated, Narancia runs into the streets to track down Squalo and Tiziano by himself. He cuts out his own tongue containing Talking Head and replaces it with one of Giorno's ladybug brooches, causing Tiziano to panic and drastically change his breathing patterns. This allows Narancia to locate Tiziano and open fire on him with Aerosmith. Tiziano sacrifices himself to give Squalo a chance to attack by providing a nearby body of liquid for Clash to teleport to: his blood. Squalo has Clash bite Narancia's throat, but Narancia withstands Clash's attack and kills Squalo too. With the two enforcers defeated, Bucciarati's crew head out of the Venice canals towards the airport to catch a plane to Sardinia.
137	24	"Notorious B.I.G / Notorious Chase"; Transliteration: "Notōriasu Biggu" (Japanese: ノトーリアス・B・I・G(ビッグ))	Takashi Kawabata	Kyōhei Suzuki	Kazuyuki Fudeyasu	March 30, 2019	May 3, 2020
The group manages to secure an airplane after escaping Venice, with Abbacchio using Moody Blues to fly the plane by replaying its pilot. As they prepare to leave, a hostile Stand user named Carne approaches them on the runway, but Mista shoots and kills him. During the flight, Giorno discovers that Carne's Stand Notorious B.I.G, (Note: "Notorious Chase" in official English releases.) a flesh-eating blob, has activated after his death and has attached itself to Giorno's right arm. Mista shoots Giorno's arm off, but Notorious B.I.G, which tracks its foes by their movement and then absorbs their energy, attacks the Sex Pistols, severely injuring Mista. Narancia attacks with Aerosmith, but he too is targeted and injured by Notorious B.I.G. Deeming Notorious B.I.G to be indestructible, Giorno forces it to latch onto his remaining left arm, then manages to dispose of it by severing his arm and sending it out of the plane. Since Gold Experience's powers come from its fists, Giorno can neither fight nor heal the wounds of himself, Mista or Narancia. Bucciarati relays the attack to Abbacchio and takes the wounded inside the turtle. Alone, Trish is approached by Notorious B.I.G, which was chasing the quickest-moving object nearby, that being the plane itself. The Stand doesn't pursue her when she remains still, instead approaching one of Giorno's throbbing brooches, which is in the process of transforming into one of Giorno's hands. Trish realizes that Giorno had created a brooch replicating one of his hands before cutting his arm off, which when attached could allow him, Mista and Narancia to recover.
138	25	"Spice Girl / Spicy Lady"; Transliteration: "Supaisu Gāru" (Japanese: スパイス・ガール)	Tatsuma Minamikawa, Jirō Fujimoto	Masakazu Takahashi	Kazuyuki Fudeyasu	April 6, 2019	May 10, 2020
Trish tries to acquire Giorno's brooch without attracting Notorious B.I.G, but it attacks her. Trish unintentionally awakens her Stand Spice Girl, (Note: "Spicy Lady" in official English releases.) who explains that it has the ability to make any surface softer and rubber-like. Spice Girl tricks Notorious B.I.G into repeatedly attacking a ticking clock that it renders elastic, making it indestructible. While it's distracted, Spice Girl slowly but firmly pierces the Stand with a pipe, causing it to evaporate. Finally safe, Trish returns to the cockpit and informs Bucciarati of Notorious B.I.G's attack, but a portion of it managed to travel through the wall and attack the engine in the rear of the plane, causing it to grow massive and fill up half of the interior of the airplane. Trish uses Spice Girl to turn the cockpit of the plane into a makeshift parachute while Notorious B.I.G and the rest of the airplane crash into the Tyrrhenian Sea. Notorious B.I.G remains trapped in the ocean due to the constantly moving waves. Thanks to Giorno's hand in his brooch, Giorno is able to heal himself and the others, and they arrive on Sardinia undetected. However, the boss senses that they survived and that Trish has awakened her Stand. Fearing that she may recall her youth at Costa Smeralda, he decides to travel to Sardinia alone to prevent anyone from discovering his identity.
139	26	"A Little Story From The Past ~My Name Is Doppio~"; Transliteration: "Honno Sukoshi Mukashi no Monogatari ~Boku no Na wa Doppio~" (Japanese: ほんの少し昔の物語 ~ぼくの名はドッピオ~)	Takahiro Kamei	Takahiro Kamei, Hikaru Murata, Hironori Aoyagi	Shin'ichi Inotsume	April 13, 2019	May 17, 2020
In the summer of 1965, a Sardinian woman in an Italian prison gave birth to a pink-haired baby boy, during which time a woman noticed that the boy's eye momentarily changed color. The baby was then taken in by the church, growing into a teenager under the care of a friendly priest. The boy became known as someone rather cowardly and slow, but open-hearted. However, one night the priest found the boy's mother underneath concrete at the church, buried but still alive, and deemed that she had been there for years. The boy caught the priest in the act; that night the entire village burned down, and the list of the dead included the priest and the boy. In the present on Sardinia, the boy, still a teenager years later, encounters a mysterious fortune-teller. The man offers to tell the teenager's fortune; he determines that the boy is looking for his fifteen-year-old daughter, but is confused due to the boy's own apparent age. The fortune teller then begs to see the boy's palm to read deeper into his fortune, even proposing to pay. The teenager suddenly snaps and physically transforms into an adult, grabbing the fortune-teller by the throat. The fortune-teller realizes that his attacker has two personalities, light and dark, with the older personality in truth being Passione's boss. From a photograph, the fortune-teller predicts the boss will soon meet the traitor Risotto Nero, the leader of the Hitman Team. King Crimson then appears, swiftly executing the fortune-teller. The boss reverts to the teenager, named Doppio, who travels to Costa Smeralda by taxi. When the boss needs to speak to and control Doppio, Doppio hallucinates a phone ringing and speaks through miscellaneous objects, believing them to be cell phones. Doppio is discovered by Risotto, who realizes that Doppio is a Stand user when he reacts to the sound of Aerosmith scouting the area, which signifies the arrival of Bucciarati's team. Risotto uses his Stand Metallica (Note: "Metallic" in official English releases.) to create razor blades and steel needles within Doppio which puncture him from the inside out. While Risotto prepares another attack, the boss "calls" Doppio and tells him to get within two meters of Risotto, which will allow the boss to swiftly take control of their shared body and kill Risotto with King Crimson before Risotto can discover his true identity. In order to help with this, the boss lends Doppio a portion of his power, which he calls Epitaph. (Note: "Eulogy" in official English releases.)
140	27	"King Crimson vs. Metallica / Emperor Crimson vs. Metallic"; Transliteration: "Kingu Kurimuzon vs. Metarika" (Japanese: キング・クリムゾン vs. メタリカ)	Taizō Yoshida	Shinji Osada	Akira Horiuchi	April 20, 2019	May 24, 2020
Through Doppio's imaginary phone, the boss instructs Doppio to use Epitaph to predict Risotto's movements by glancing 10 seconds into the future. With Epitaph's power, Doppio sees a vision of a pair of scissors piercing out of his throat. Unable to avoid this from happening, Doppio quickly clasps his throat and removes the scissors. He deduces Risotto's ability to transform the iron in his body into metallic objects, as well as the ability for Risotto to cloak his own visibility with iron. Next, Doppio sees a vision of a severed foot and, sensing Risotto's direction, throws the scissors and cuts off Risotto's foot. Risotto, now aware of Doppio's pre-cognitive abilities, reattaches his severed foot with metal staples while noting Doppio's two different personalities. Risotto presses his attack, transforming more iron from Doppio's body into objects; the loss of iron from his body not only weakens Doppio, but it also reduces his body's ability to absorb oxygen, leaving him short of breath. Risotto prepares to finish off Doppio, slowly coming to the realization of the identity of Doppio's second personality. However, scalpels that Doppio had earlier attempted to throw at Risotto ended up flying in the direction of Bucciarati's group, attracting their attention. Risotto is suddenly shot from behind by Aerosmith, which can only detect Risotto's breathing. The boss takes control of Doppio's body and explains his plan to Risotto. Fatally wounded, Risotto realizes that Doppio's other personality is the boss.
141	28	"Beneath a Sky on the Verge of Falling"; Transliteration: "Ima ni mo Ochite Kisō na Sora no Shita de" (Japanese: 今にも落ちて来そうな空の下で)	Hideya Takahashi	Hideya Takahashi	Yasuko Kobayashi	April 27, 2019	May 31, 2020
Risotto uses his last bit of strength to grab the boss and attempt to trick Aerosmith into shooting the both of them, but King Crimson erases the time in which the bullets were shot to avoid them, killing Risotto. The boss eats a nearby frog to regain some iron as Bucciarati and Narancia head to the scene of the battle. Abbacchio uses Moody Blues to search through the past on the Costa Smeralda beach, trying to recreate the boss's face. Bucciarati and Narancia see Risotto's corpse, then unexpectedly find a young boy tied behind a rock and missing blood, with his lips sewn together. Back on the beach, Abbacchio is distracted by a group of young soccer players trying to retrieve their ball from a tree. When he goes to help them, he is mortally wounded by the boss, who impersonated one of the young boys. In the afterlife, Abbacchio reunites with his deceased partner from the police force, who commends him for his diligence in helping his friends. When Bucciarati's group come across Abbacchio's corpse, Giorno discovers that just before Moody Blues disappeared forever, Abbacchio used it to successfully recreate a death mask of the boss's face in a nearby stone pillar.
142	29	"Get to the Roman Colosseum! / Verso il Colosseo di Roma"; Transliteration: "Mokutekichi wa Rōma! Korosseo" (Japanese: 目的地はローマ！コロッセオ)	Yūsuke Kubo	Yūsuke Kubo	Shōgo Yasukawa	May 11, 2019	August 2, 2020
Bucciarati and Giorno search police and Interpol databases for a face that matches the one that Abbacchio created, without success. However, a voice within their laptop informs them that the boss's name is Diavolo and that King Crimson is unbeatable, except possibly by using a Stand arrow which they can collect from the voice's owner in Rome. The voice tells them the history of the Stand arrows: they were created from a meteorite which crashed in Greenland and house a virus which kills most but gives people superhuman abilities if they survive its effects. Convinced the offer is genuine, Bucciarati agrees to meet the person behind the voice at the Colosseum. Meanwhile, Diavolo reluctantly orders Doppio to send Cioccolata and Secco, the sadistic remaining members of his elite guard, after Bucciarati's team. As soon as the team arrives on the Italian mainland, they are ambushed by Cioccolata and Secco. Cioccolata uses his Stand, Green Day, (Note: "Green Tea" in official English releases.) to spread a deadly mold around the area. Giorno realizes that it activates and infects people when they descend to a lower altitude, so Mista blows up the boat's fuel tanks, throwing the team upwards onto the shore.
143	30	"Green Day and Oasis, Part 1 / Green Tea and Sanctuary, Part 1"; Transliteration: "Gurīn Dei to Oashisu Sono Ichi" (Japanese: グリーン・ディとオアシス その①)	Takashi Kawabata	Yōji Satō	Shōgo Yasukawa	May 18, 2019	August 9, 2020
Bucciarati sends the mold-affected Narancia back into the turtle to be healed by Giorno as he and Mista begin making their way up into the village to escape Cioccolata's deadly mold. As they climb upwards out of Green Day's range, Secco ambushes them with his Stand Oasis, (Note: "Sanctuary" in official English releases.) which allows him to swim through and soften solid ground. Secco's attack threatens to pull the group down and trigger Green Day, so Bucciarati jumps off a ledge and ambushes Secco, who is surprised that Bucciarati is not affected by the mold as it should attack all living things. Bucciarati's team manages to escape in a car and drive towards Rome, but on the way Giorno notices that Bucciarati has a hole in his wrist, his skin is cold and that he has no pulse. Bucciarati reveals that although Giorno brought him back to life after King Crimson's attack in Venice, he had already died and he is only still moving due to Gold Experience's ability, already accepting his fate. Arriving in Rome, the group is ambushed by Cioccolata and Secco again, this time from a helicopter which spreads Green Day's mold over the city. Secco drops down into the ground to attack them once more. Giorno and Mista shoot a building with Gold Experience-infused bullets which sprout roots to grab and keep the helicopter in place. Giorno and Mista climb the roots to pursue Cioccolata while Bucciarati prepares to deal with Secco.
144	31	"Green Day and Oasis, Part 2 / Green Tea and Sanctuary, Part 2"; Transliteration: "Gurīn Dei to Oashisu Sono Ni" (Japanese: グリーン・ディとオアシス その②)	Jirō Fujimoto	Yasuhiro Kimura	Kazuyuki Fudeyasu	May 25, 2019	August 30, 2020
While making light of Secco's poor verbal skills, Bucciarati is suddenly overwhelmed by the punches of Secco, who rebounds his fists from the ground to increase his speed and power. Giorno and Mista climb the building holding Cioccolata's helicopter, but when Mista fires Sex Pistols inside, they cannot find Cioccolata and instead they and Mista are wounded. Giorno and Pistol No. 5 enter the helicopter, but Cioccolata has surgically separated his body into pieces, which are able to stay living thanks to Green Day's mold. Cioccolata attacks Giorno, trying to force him downwards and trigger the mold. Giorno manages to launch one of Mista's bullets into Cioccolata's head and he apparently falls dead, but Giorno suspects that he is faking. Cioccolata sits up and announces that his severed arm is ready to kill Mista. However, the bullet Giorno shot into Cioccolata's head transforms into a beetle which chews through his skull. Giorno uses Gold Experience to viciously pummel Cioccolata to death and send his body flying into a garbage truck. Underground, Secco calls Cioccolata on his cell phone, but he does not answer. Secco then notices and listens to a voice message from Cioccolata stating that they are invincible and that he loves Secco. As Secco again prepares to attack Bucciarati, the scene is being watched through binoculars from a man in the Colosseum.
145	32	"Green Day and Oasis, Part 3 / Green Tea and Sanctuary, Part 3"; Transliteration: "Gurīn Dei to Oashisu Sono San" (Japanese: グリーン・ディとオアシス その③)	Minoru Ōhara	Shinji Osada	Kazuyuki Fudeyasu	June 1, 2019	September 6, 2020
Because of his Stand's superior speed, Secco severely injures Bucciarati, who decides to flee. Secco then receives a final voice message from Cioccolata, who informs him that Bucciarati's group intend to meet someone in the Colosseum who has a plan to beat the boss. The mysterious man is revealed to be Jean Pierre Polnareff, who has one of the Stand arrows but is now missing many of his body parts and uses a wheelchair. Secco, upon learning of Cioccolata's death, disavows him and speaks intelligently, his prior simple behavior being an act. Bucciarati uses Sticky Fingers to escape underground towards the Colosseum, but Secco tracks him using his highly sensitive hearing. Secco forces Bucciarati out of the ground by creating a rain of stone spikes, but Bucciarati bursts a nearby car tire to pop Secco's eardrums. Panicking, Secco grabs a nearby boy, who coincidentally happens to be Doppio, intending to use him as a hostage to escape. However, Bucciarati uses Sticky Fingers to harmlessly punch through Doppio and unzip Secco's neck. Struggling to save himself, Secco stumbles into the garbage truck containing Cioccolata's body as it drives away. Meanwhile, Bucciarati's body starts falling apart from the damage it has sustained, and Doppio prepares to kill him.
146	33	"His Name Is Diavolo"; Transliteration: "Soitsu no Na wa Diaboro" (Japanese: そいつの名はディアボロ)	Minoru Ōhara	Hironori Aoyagi, Keiichi Matsuki	Akira Horiuchi	June 8, 2019	September 13, 2020
Rather than kill Bucciarati, Diavolo has Doppio use him to find out who he is planning to meet. Doppio helps Bucciarati across the road to the Colosseum, but stops when he spots Mista and realizes that Bucciarati's team is nearby. Diavolo calls Doppio and tells him that Bucciarati's body is actually dead and that, due to his sight and hearing now failing him, he is only able to sense the souls inside people. Diavolo disguises Doppio's soul as Trish's to deceive Bucciarati. After they reach the Colosseum, Doppio and Bucciarati encounter Polnareff, who Diavolo recognizes. Years earlier, Diavolo had unearthed six Stand arrows in Egypt, keeping one and selling the rest to Enyaba. He then used the power of the Stand arrow to build his criminal organization. He was tracked down by Polnareff and the two battled, the victorious Diavolo leaving Polnareff's broken body for dead. Back in the Colosseum, Diavolo takes control of his and Doppio's shared body, abandons Bucciarati, and makes his way towards Polnareff. Though Polnareff has created a method to track King Crimson's erased time by cutting himself and counting the number of blood drops, King Crimson still gains the upper hand, punching through Polnareff. Diavolo recovers the arrow, but not before Polnareff uses it to pierce his own Stand, Silver Chariot, transforming it into a new Stand which appears as a shadowy figure.
147	34	"The Requiem Quietly Plays, Part 1"; Transliteration: "Rekuiemu wa Shizuka ni Kanaderareru Sono Ichi" (Japanese: 鎮魂歌(レクイエム)は静かに奏でられる その①)	Minoru Ōhara	Norihito Takahashi	Shōgo Yasukawa	June 15, 2019	September 20, 2020
The shadowy figure takes the Stand arrow from Diavolo and causes everyone in Rome to fall asleep. As Bucciarati's team awakens, they awkwardly discover that they've switched bodies with those that were closest in proximity to them, with Giorno swapping with Narancia and Mista with Trish. After the initial shock, they find that they can still control their own Stands, although they are unaware of who inhabits Bucciarati's unconscious body. Meanwhile, Polnareff's soul has transferred into the turtle, Coco Jumbo. He explains that his former Stand Silver Chariot holds the arrow and that it has become Chariot Requiem, which causes souls to switch bodies. He tells them that he is unable to control this Stand and that their only option to defeat Diavolo is to retrieve the arrow from Chariot Requiem. He also warns them of Doppio, though he is unsure of his relationship to Diavolo. At the Colosseum's entrance, the group sees Diavolo charging towards Chariot Requiem. However, after he summons Sticky Fingers to cut off Chariot Requiem's arm, they realize that Bucciarati is inside Diavolo's body.
148	35	"The Requiem Quietly Plays, Part 2"; Transliteration: "Rekuiemu wa Shizuka ni Kanaderareru Sono Ni" (Japanese: 鎮魂歌(レクイエム)は静かに奏でられる その②)	Yūsuke Kubo	Yūsuke Kubo	Shin'ichi Inotsume	June 22, 2019	September 27, 2020
Members of the group attempt to retrieve the arrow but they discover that Chariot Requiem has the ability to turn their Stands against them. Bucciarati orders Mista to shoot his still-unconscious body, assuming it is possessed by Diavolo. However, shortly afterwards they experience time erasure during which Diavolo uses King Crimson to impale Giorno's body containing Narancia on broken iron bars. Although Giorno is able to heal the wounds on his own body, he is unable to save Narancia who has already died, and his soul re-enters his own body. Because Diavolo is active, Polnareff deduces that he has two personalities and that Doppio's soul must be inside Bucciarati's body while Diavolo's soul is inside someone else's. Bucciarati suspects that Diavolo killed Narancia to eliminate the team's radar and approach them undetected. The group then chase after Chariot Requiem; after catching up to it, Bucciarati trips the Stand, which drops the arrow and walks on without it. Polnareff, no longer being a Stand user, is able to grab it without being attacked back, though doing so attracts Chariot Requiem's attention. As it charges back towards him, he urges Mista to quickly pierce his own Stand with the arrow before Chariot Requiem can take it back.
149	36	"Diavolo Surfaces"; Transliteration: "Diaboro Fujō" (Japanese: ディアボロ浮上)	Taizō Yoshida	Takahiro Kamei	Shin'ichi Inotsume	June 29, 2019	October 4, 2020
Doppio dies in Bucciarati's bullet-riddled body feeling lonely and abandoned. Meanwhile, Chariot Requiem races towards Polnareff, but when Mista tries to shoot it, his gun suddenly breaks apart. Chariot Requiem retrieves the arrow and walks off; however, its additional ability takes effect, mutating the bodies of organisms nearby. Inspecting Mista's broken gun and determining that Diavolo destroyed it during erased time, Giorno deduces that Diavolo must be hiding within the body of someone in the group and plans to touch each of them with Gold Experience to detect Diavolo's soul. Mista refuses, fearing Diavolo could be inside Giorno's body, so Bucciarati agrees to go first. As Giorno moves to check Bucciarati, King Crimson suddenly appears from Mista's body and swiftly severs Giorno's arm. When Trish summons Spice Girl in retaliation, King Crimson grabs hold of her Stand, using it to control Mista's body. Diavolo concludes that Chariot Requiem is effectively the shadow of one's own soul, cast by a light source it generates behind each of their heads. He destroys the light source behind King Crimson's head, dissipating Chariot Requiem and allowing him to obtain the arrow. Giorno converts the drops of his blood on King Crimson's hand into a colony of ants which chew through the arrow's shaft so the arrowhead falls to the ground. When King Crimson tries to pick it up, Trish uses Spice Girl to knock the arrow back towards the group. King Crimson then ruthlessly punches through Spice Girl, using the force to propel Mista's body, and himself, towards the arrow.
150	37	"King of Kings"; Transliteration: "Kingu Obu Kingusu" (Japanese: 王の中の王(キング・オブ・キングス))	Kyōhei Suzuki, Minoru Ōhara	Kyōhei Suzuki	Kazuyuki Fudeyasu	July 6, 2019	October 11, 2020
Diavolo attempts to grab the arrow with King Crimson, but Bucciarati destroys Chariot Requiem, returning everybody's souls to their respective bodies. However, with his body already dead, Bucciarati's soul begins to ascend to the heavens. Before departing, he thanks Giorno for making him feel alive again when they met and leaves the arrow in Giorno's hands. Diavolo contemplates escaping after seeing Giorno with the arrow, but when Trish reveals her father's intention to flee, he has a change of heart, believing he is entitled to be king and that he should have no reason to run away. Giorno pierces Gold Experience with the arrow, apparently damaging Gold Experience; Diavolo takes advantage of this and attacks Giorno to reclaim the arrow, shattering Gold Experience's face. However, Diavolo's attack doesn't harm Giorno; instead, Gold Experience absorbs the arrow into its body and sheds its skin like a shell, revealing its new form as Gold Experience Requiem. (Note: "Golden Wind Requiem" in official English releases.) After using Epitaph to witness a vision of himself defeating Giorno, Diavolo uses King Crimson to erase time and attack Giorno; however, Gold Experience Requiem uses its power to nullify his attack, rewinding time to the point of King Crimson's activation. With Diavolo confused and unable to fight back, Gold Experience Requiem viciously pummels him.
151	38	"Gold Experience Requiem / Golden Wind Requiem"; Transliteration: "Gōrudo Ekusuperiensu Rekuiemu" (Japanese: ゴールド・E(エクスペリエンス)・レクイエム)	Toshiyuki Katō, Jirō Fujimoto	Shō Sugawara	Yasuko Kobayashi	July 28, 2019	October 18, 2020
Mortally wounded, Diavolo falls into the river. Trish urges Giorno to look for him, but Giorno claims that it won't be necessary. Diavolo attempts to crawl into a tunnel, but is fatally stabbed by a homeless man who is under the influence of the drugs that Diavolo sells. When Diavolo awakens, he finds himself on an operating table, unable to move. A doctor, who ignores Diavolo as he talks to her, performs an autopsy on him; Diavolo remains immobile and in excruciating pain as she operates on him. Diavolo suddenly appears on a city streetside; as he begins to realize what is happening, he is startled into falling into the path of an oncoming car. Meanwhile, Giorno explains to Trish and Mista that the power of Gold Experience Requiem has doomed Diavolo to die over and over for all eternity. In a flashback to before Bucciarati and the others meet Giorno, a florist approaches Bucciarati and asks him to avenge his daughter. She apparently committed suicide, but he believes that she was killed by her boyfriend, a sculptor named Scolippi. Mista goes to interrogate the sculptor, but on his way he sees strange round stones. Upon meeting the sculptor, Mista realizes Scolippi is a Stand user after finding another stone next to him sculpted in the form of Bucciarati at the moment of his death.
152	39	"The Sleeping Slave"; Transliteration: "Nemureru Dorei" (Japanese: 眠れる奴隷)	Jirō Fujimoto, Taizō Yoshida	Yasutoshi Iwasaki, Hideya Takahashi	Yasuko Kobayashi	July 28, 2019	October 25, 2020
Mista tries to force the truth from Scolippi, who explains that his Stand Rolling Stones (Note: "Prophecy Stones" in official English releases.) creates stones with images of people at the moment of their deaths. Once a person touches their own stone, they are allowed to choose to accept their death. He affirms that after the florist's daughter touched her stone, she realized that she was about to die and committed suicide to allow her organs to be transplanted into her ailing father and save his life. Upon learning this, Mista desperately prevents Bucciarati from touching his own stone, nearly dying in the process. Though he succeeds, the stones take the forms of Abbacchio and Narancia as well, foreshadowing their demises. Back in the present, Giorno and the others learn that, despite his body being dead, Polnareff managed to keep his soul attached to the turtle, which Giorno decides to keep the arrow inside for safekeeping. Mista leads the others back to the Colloseum to tend to Bucciarati's wounds, unaware of his death. Sometime later, Giorno is watched over by Mista and Polnareff as he is instated as the new leader of Passione.

== Recap specials ==
No. overall	No. in season	Title	Original release date
126.5	13.5	"The Beginning of Golden Wind"; Transliteration: "Inizio del Vento Aureo"	January 5, 2019
A recap of events in episodes 1–13.
134.5	21.5	"Determination"; Transliteration: "determinazione"	March 9, 2019
A recap of events and flashbacks in episodes 1–21.
141.5	28.5	"Destiny"; Transliteration: "destino"	May 4, 2019
A recap of events in episodes 1–28.

== Home media release ==
=== Japanese ===
Warner Bros. Japan (Region 2, Blu-ray & DVD)
Volume	Discs	Episodes	Release date	Ref.
1	1 (BD); 1 (DVD)	1–4	December 19, 2018	
2	1 (BD); 1 (DVD)	5–8	February 13, 2019	
3	1 (BD); 1 (DVD)	9–12	March 13, 2019	
4	1 (BD); 1 (DVD)	13–16	April 10, 2019	
5	1 (BD); 1 (DVD)	17–20	May 15, 2019	
6	1 (BD); 1 (DVD)	21–24	July 10, 2019	
7	1 (BD); 1 (DVD)	25–28	August 14, 2019	
8	1 (BD); 1 (DVD)	29–32	September 11, 2019	
9	1 (BD); 1 (DVD)	33–36	October 9, 2019	
10	1 (BD); 1 (DVD)	37–39	November 13, 2019	
Box 1	4	1–19	August 31, 2022	
Box 2	4	20–39	August 31, 2022	

=== English ===
Viz Media (Region 1, Blu-ray & DVD)
Volume	Discs	Episodes	Regular edition release date	Limited edition release date	Ref.
Part 1	3	1–20	July 13, 2021	September 1, 2020	
Part 2	3	21–39	November 2, 2021	February 23, 2021	
