= Andru Donalds =

Jamaican musician (born 1974)

- Born: 16 November 1974 (age 51); Kingston, Jamaica
- Genres: Reggae-pop, reggae, soul
- Occupation: Singer-songwriter
- Years active: 1994–present
- Labels: Sony Music; Seven Days Music; 313 Music Jwp
- Website: https://www.andrudonalds.org

Andru Donalds (born 16 November 1974) is a Jamaican musician and vocalist, who also worked in collaboration with the Enigma project. Donalds had a hit single in America in 1995 with "Mishale", which reached No. 38 on the Billboard Hot 100.

== Biography ==
Andru Donalds was born in Kingston, Jamaica. His musical style ranges from pop, rock and roll, to reggae and ballads. His influences include Bob Marley, Black Uhuru, The Beatles, Michael Jackson and Prince.

=== Solo career ===
After leaving school, Donalds traveled to England, the Netherlands and New York City, to develop his musical abilities as singer and songwriter. He met the producer and songwriter Eric Foster White, who had hits with stars such as Frank Sinatra, Whitney Houston, Julio Iglesias, Backstreet Boys, and Boyzone. Together they produced the debut album Andru Donalds, with the single "Mishale" becoming successful worldwide.

His second album, Damned If I Don't, was released in 1997. The song "Somebody's Baby" was used for the soundtrack of the Oscar-winning film Good Will Hunting.

=== Enigma ===
In 1999, Donalds joined Michael Cretu's Enigma project and was the lead singer on four studio albums; The Screen Behind the Mirror, Voyageur , A Posteriori, and Seven Lives Many Faces.

Cretu also collaborated for Donalds' solo albums, Snowin' Under My Skin and Let's Talk About It. A single from Snowin' Under My Skin, "All Out of Love" reached platinum status.

Andru also co-wrote and performed on "Distorted Love" and "Je t’aime Till My Dying Day" of Enigma's album Seven Lives Many Faces.

=== Other collaborations ===
In 2005, Donalds co-produced and performed the song "And I Feel" for the soundtrack of the German film Barefoot / Barfuß, starring and directed by Til Schweiger.

In 2005, he co-produced with the Ukrainian singer Evgenia Vlasova for the song "Limbo".

Donalds also wrote a song for Sandra, the former wife of Cretu: "The Way I Am", the lead single from her The Art of Love album released in 2007.

In 2023, he performed the "Sorry (Wish I could Change)" duet with Diana King.

Other Great Music Producers Andru has worked with

Donalds also worked with Sly & Robbie on the following recordings:

- "Stop The Pain" in 2009 (Tony Rebel)
- "Serenade" in 2012
- "Colours" from the Karma Free Project (Rio Brazil Band) in 2016

== Discography ==
=== Solo albums ===
Studio albums

- Andru Donalds (1994)
- Damned If I Don't (1997)
- Snowin' Under My Skin (1999)
- Let's Talk About It (2001)
- Trouble in Paradise (2011)

=== Compilation albums ===
- Best Of (2006)

=== Singles ===
Year	Title
1994	"Mishale"
1994	"Save Me Now"
1995	"Tryin' To Tell Ya"
1997	"(Still) Lovin' You"
1998	"Beautiful Friday"
1999	"All Out Of Love"
1999	"Simple Obsession"
2000	"Precious Little Diamond"
2000	"(I'm Not Your) One Night Lover"
2001	"Hurts To Be in Love"
2001	"Someday"
2006	"Wind of Hope" (radio only)
2006	"Dreamer"
2006	"Let The Stars Fall Down"
2007	AD07 (EP)
2010	"Marble Eyes"
2011	"Falling Down"
2012	"Serenade"
2014	"Life" (with Aboutblank feat. KLC)
2015	"I Believe"
2016	"Cold Nights"
2025	"Simple To Love"

=== Songs with Enigma ===
Year	Title
2003	"Boum-Boum"
2003	"In the Shadow, In the Light"
2006	"Hello and Welcome"
2008	"Distorted Love"
2008	"Je T'Aime Till My Dying Day"

=== Soundtracks ===
Year	Title
1997	"Somebody's Baby"
2005	"And I Feel"

=== with Eugenia Vlasova ===
Albums

Year	Title
2006	Wind of Hope
