= Following the Sun (Enigma song) =

Single by Enigma

from the album Voyageur
- Released: 10 November 2003
- Studio: A.R.T., Ibiza
- Genre: Pop
- Length: 3:53
- Label: Virgin/EMI
- Songwriters: Michael Cretu; Jens Gad
- Producer: Michael Cretu

Enigma singles chronology
"Voyageur" (2003)	"Following the Sun" (2003)	"Boum-Boum" (2004)

Audio video
- "Following The Sun" on YouTube

"Following the Sun" is a 2003 song created by the German band Enigma. The single was the second released from their fifth album, Voyageur.

== Track listing ==
1. "Following the Sun" (Radio Edit) – 4:19
2. "Following the Sun" (Album Version) – 5:47
3. "Voyageur" (Fab 4 Mix) – 4:31

== Charts ==
Chart performance for "Following the Sun"
Chart (2003)	Peak position
Germany (GfK)	97
