= The Screen Behind the Mirror =

Studio album by Enigma
- Released: 14 January 2000
- Recorded: 1999
- Studios: A.R.T. (Ibiza, Spain)
- Genres: New-age; ambient
- Length: 43:34
- Label: Virgin
- Producer: Michael Cretu

Enigma chronology
| Trilogy (1998) | The Screen Behind the Mirror (2000) | Love Sensuality Devotion: The Greatest Hits (2001) |

Singles from The Screen Behind the Mirror
- 1. "Gravity of Love" Released: 15 November 1999; 2. "Push the Limits" Released: 17 April 2000

The Screen Behind the Mirror is the fourth studio album by German musical project Enigma, released on 14 January 2000 by Virgin Records. It was recorded at the A.R.T. Studios in Ibiza, Spain. The album was inspired by the fate of humanity and its search for meaning in the wake of the New Millennium. The album samples the movement "O Fortuna" from Orff's Carmina Burana, in several of the album tracks.

== Composition ==
"The Gate" begins the album with its trademark Enigma horn, fused together with Elisabeth Houghton narrating astronomical facts about the fourth planet from the sun, Mars, similar to the ending title track of Vangelis' album, Albedo 0.39. "O Fortuna, velut Luna, statu variabilis" cuts into it rather abruptly and loudly, and ends quickly for the voice to continue the recital unfazed, as it continues deep into the next song, "Push the Limits" for 24 seconds.

"Push the Limits" introduces first a high-paced beat, first some snare drums and then several other layers of music gradually to form a complex and multilayered track. Elisabeth Houghton whispers the lyrics to the song and this brings in a presumably mellow voice (actually an electric guitar solo modified to sound so) throughout the slow centre of the track, and as the music picks up, Elisabeth whispers again and the soft moans of a girl enters. Further strong beats brings an end to this 6'26" track as it fades to silence, leaving a blurry mumble at the end of the song, and the beginning of the next one.

Chants of "O Fortuna, velut Luna" appears at the start of the next song, "Gravity of Love" as Ruth-Ann Boyle sings with sounds of "O Fortuna" in between. A woman and a man whispers a line each before Ruth-Ann resumes and "O Fortuna" comes in, following the same pattern. The beats of this track becomes more and more audible as each of the instruments fade away, and eventually it stops.

"Smell of Desire" reintroduces the shakuhachi flute from the MCMXC a.D. as Jens Gad plays the guitar occasionally in the middle of the song. Reversed Gregorian chants from "Sadeness (Reprise)" and vocals from "Mea Culpa" lead to Sandra Cretu's whispers at song's end with more reversed chants and fades into the next track.

Andru Donalds sings on this high tempo and rock-ish song, "Modern Crusaders", with significantly large portions of "O Fortuna" in the middle as Jens Gad plays the guitar. Andru continues on with the vocals and the track ends with an organ sample from Bach's "Toccata and Fugue in D Minor".

In "Traces (Light and Weight)", the sounds of a match being struck and water droplets, symbolising the elements of fire and water respectively, form a loop together with a light beat, and the chiming of church bells entering occasionally. A vague crying sound and the chiming continues and after the beat stops, it fades into the following song.

"The Screen Behind the Mirror" reintroduces the beat used in "Sadeness (Part I)" as vocals from Andru Donalds and Ruth-Ann Boyle sing part of the lyrics from "Gravity of Love". An earlier version of this song, named "The Experience" only appears on the Australian promo version of the album.

The previous song crossfades into "Endless Quest", where further more snare drums and shakuhachi flutes can be heard, with two different guitar riffs from Jens Gad replacing the former two instruments. The paces turns uncontrollably high and somewhat erratic before it stops with sounds of heavy breathing and segues into "Camera Obscura", where it immediately starts with a sample of "Modern Crusaders" with Michael Cretu on vocals, being reversed and sections of "O Fortuna" being followed up quickly. The pace and music then turns erratic and chaotic, and fades gently into the next song.

"Between Mind & Heart" brings in a light and breezy pace and Michael Cretu sings in this track. Sandra Cretu only appears in this track for the whispers as sounds of gentle, ethereal Chinese yangqin can be heard. It fades with more whispers and vocals.

Ruth-Anne Boyle sings in the last track, "Silence Must Be Heard" as the album picks up its pace, with echoes in the middle. The effect repeats itself again for one more time as it quickly resumes back the original pace. Ruth-Ann's vocals turn into whispers and the earlier crying voice enters, before ending the album with the signature Enigma horn.

The song "Modern Crusaders" is used as the second ending theme song for the Golden Wind arc of the JoJo's Bizarre Adventure anime series; the series had previously referenced Enigma as the namesake of an antagonist's anthropomorphic "Stand" ability in the Diamond Is Unbreakable arc.

== Reception ==
Professional ratings
Review scores
| Source | Rating |
|---|---|
| AllMusic | 2/5 stars |

Heather Phares of AllMusic wrote, "Though it doesn't reveal significant growth or change in Enigma's work, The Screen Behind the Mirror will please fans of the group's other atmospheric works."

== Track listing ==
| No. | Title | Lyrics | Music | Length |
|---|---|---|---|---|
| 1. | "The Gate" | Michael Cretu | Cretu | 2:03 |
| 2. | "Push the Limits" | Cretu | Cretu; Jens Gad | 6:27 |
| 3. | "Gravity of Love" | Cretu | Cretu | 4:01 |
| 4. | "Smell of Desire" | Cretu; David Fairstein | Cretu | 4:55 |
| 5. | "Modern Crusaders" | Cretu | Cretu | 3:51 |
| 6. | "Traces (Light and Weight)" | | Cretu; Gad | 4:13 |
| 7. | "The Screen Behind the Mirror" | Cretu | Cretu | 3:59 |
| 8. | "Endless Quest" | | Cretu | 3:07 |
| 9. | "Camera Obscura" | Cretu | Cretu | 1:39 |
| 10. | "Between Mind & Heart" | Cretu | Cretu | 3:59 |
| 11. | "Silence Must Be Heard" | Cretu | Cretu; Gad | 5:20 |
| Total length: | | | | 43:34 |

== Personnel ==
Credits adapted from the liner notes of The Screen Behind the Mirror.

- Elisabeth Houghton – voices
- Sandra Cretu – voices
- Ruth-Ann – lead vocals
- Andru Donalds – lead vocals
- Michael Cretu – lead vocals, engineering, production
- Jens Gad – guitars, engineering
- Johann Zambryski – art direction
- Lmp – design
- Steffen Jagenburg – some original photography

== Charts ==
=== Weekly charts ===
Weekly chart performance for The Screen Behind the Mirror
| Chart (2000) | Peak position |
|---|---|
| Australian Albums (ARIA) | 44 |
| Austrian Albums (Ö3 Austria) | 6 |
| Belgian Albums (Ultratop Flanders) | 28 |
| Belgian Albums (Ultratop Wallonia) | 19 |
| Canadian Albums (Billboard) | 12 |
| Czech Albums (ČNS IFPI) | 3 |
| Danish Albums (Hitlisten) | 2 |
| Dutch Albums (Album Top 100) | 4 |
| European Albums (Music & Media) | 2 |
| Finnish Albums (Suomen virallinen lista) | 5 |
| French Albums (SNEP) | 16 |
| German Albums (Offizielle Top 100) | 2 |
| Greek Albums (IFPI) | 1 |
| Hungarian Albums (MAHASZ) | 9 |
| Irish Albums (IRMA) | 41 |
| Italian Albums (FIMI) | 13 |
| New Zealand Albums (RMNZ) | 8 |
| Norwegian Albums (VG-lista) | 2 |
| Portuguese Albums (AFP) | 9 |
| Scottish Albums (Official Charts) | 7 |
| Spanish Albums (AFYVE) | 14 |
| Swedish Albums (Sverigetopplistan) | 7 |
| Swiss Albums (Schweizer Hitparade) | 4 |
| UK Albums (Official Charts) | 7 |
| US Billboard 200 | 33 |

=== Year-end charts ===
Year-end chart performance for The Screen Behind the Mirror
| Chart (2000) | Position |
|---|---|
| Canadian Albums (Nielsen SoundScan) | 138 |
| Dutch Albums (Album Top 100) | 53 |
| European Albums (Music & Media) | 54 |
| German Albums (Offizielle Top 100) | 58 |
| Swedish Albums & Compilations (Sverigetopplistan) | 97 |
| Swiss Albums (Schweizer Hitparade) | 60 |

== Certifications and sales ==
Certifications and sales for The Screen Behind the Mirror
| Region | Certification | Certified units/sales |
|---|---|---|
| Canada (Music Canada) | Gold | 50,000^{^} |
| Denmark | — | 14,712 |
| Germany (BVMI) | Gold | 150,000^{^} |
| Netherlands (NVPI) | Gold | 40,000^{^} |
| Norway (IFPI Norway) | Gold | 25,000^{*} |
| Sweden (GLF) | Gold | 40,000^{^} |
| Switzerland (IFPI Switzerland) | Gold | 25,000^{^} |
| United Kingdom (BPI) | Gold | 100,000^{‡} |
| United States (RIAA) | Gold | 500,000^{^} |
^{*} Sales figures based on certification alone.^{^} Shipments figures based on certification alone.^{‡} Sales+streaming figures based on certification alone.
