= Turn Around (Enigma song) =

Single by Enigma

from the album Love Sensuality Devotion: The Greatest Hits
- Released: 17 September 2001
- Studio: A.R.T. Studios, Ibiza
- Genre: New age
- Length: 3:53
- Label: Virgin / EMI
- Songwriters: Cretu, Jens Gad
- Producer: Michael Cretu

Enigma singles chronology
"Push the Limits" (2000)	"Turn Around" (2001)	"Voyageur" (2003)

Music video
- "Turn Around" on YouTube

"Turn Around" is a 2001 song created by the musical project, Enigma. The single was the only one which was released from the compilation album, Love Sensuality Devotion: The Greatest Hits.

== Single track listing ==
- 2-track CD single
1. "Turn Around (Radio Edit)" – 3:53
2. "Gravity of Love (Chilled Club Mix)" – 5:27
- 3-track CD single with video
1. "Turn Around (Radio Edit)" – 3:53
2. "Turn Around (Northern Lights Club Mix)" – 10:40
3. "Gravity of Love (Chilled Club Mix)" – 5:27
4. "Turn Around Multimedia Track"

== Charts ==
Chart (2001)	Peak position
Germany (GfK)	65
Switzerland (Schweizer Hitparade)	45
