= Eppur si muove (EP) =

EP by Enigma
- Released: 7 November 2006
- Genre: New age
- Label: Virgin
- Producer: Michael Cretu

Enigma chronology
"Goodbye Milky Way" (2006)	Eppur si muove (2006)	"La Puerta Del Cielo/Seven Lives" (2008)

Eppur si muove is an EP by Enigma that was released on 7 November 2006 in Greece.

== Overview ==
The EP was only released as a 12" single, although all four tracks were available as digital downloads on iTunes and also appeared as audio bonus tracks on the DVD A posteriori Video Album, which was released on 15 December 2006. The remixes would also later be included on the Private Lounge Remix album version of A posteriori, which was released via iTunes Store on 18 March 2007 in Germany and on 26 March in the rest of Europe.

The remixes were made by Jean F. Cochois ("Dreaming of Andromeda" (Jean F. Cochois Remix)), Wolfgang Filz ("20.000 Miles Over the Sea" (BocaJunior Remix)), Ralf Hildenbeutel ("The Alchemist" (The Alchemist's Vision by Ralf Hildenbeutel)) and Tocadisco ("Eppur si muove" (Tocadisco Remix)).

"Eppur si muove", alternately spelled "E pur si muove!", is an Italian phrase translated to "And yet it moves", attributed to Galileo Galilei after he was sentenced by the Roman Inquisition to recant his belief in heliocentrism.

== Track listing ==
Publisher: 1-2-3 Music/Crocodile Music.

All tracks are written by Michael Cretu.

No.	Title	Length
1.	"Eppur si muove" (Tocadisco Remix)	6:37
2.	"The Alchemist" (The Alchemist's Vision by Ralf Hildenbeutel)	7:17
3.	"Dreaming of Andromeda" (Jean F. Cochois Remix)	7:27
4.	"20.000 Miles Over the Sea" (BocaJunior Remix)	7:06
Total length:		28:27

== Notes ==
- Joar Grimstvedt (16 December 2006). "Enigma: Eppur Si Muove (EP 2006)". Joar Grimstvedt Site. www.five.no.
