= A Posteriori =

2006 studio album by Enigma

Studio album by Enigma
- Released: 22 September 2006
- Recorded: 2005–2006
- Studios: Various places, with the "Alchemist" (all-in-one mobile computer studio)
- Genres: New-age; ambient; trance; house; electronic
- Length: 53:36
- Label: Virgin
- Producer: Michael Cretu

Enigma chronology
15 Years After (2005)	A Posteriori (2006)	Seven Lives Many Faces (2008)

A Posteriori is the sixth studio album by German musical project Enigma, released on 22 September 2006 by Virgin Records. In December 2006, the album was nominated for Best New Age Album at the 2007 Grammy Awards.

While the previous album, Voyageur, contained minimal amounts of the project's signature sounds, A Posteriori only contains the signature "Enigma horn" (a foghorn) during the opening minute of the album, and even then it is a fleeting glimpse. Coupled with the album's subject matter of the collision of the Milky Way and Andromeda galaxies, A Posteriori is, compared to earlier releases, stark and foreboding.

== Background ==
News about the album's title and track list were first made public on 18 July 2006 through the Crocodile-Music.de website and EnigmaMusic.com's forums, while the album cover was made public ten days later. The first track to be made public was "Hello and Welcome", released as a standalone single in 2006. Enigma's management subsequently stated that a new version would be included on the record, while the lead single off the album proper would be "Goodbye Milky Way".

=== Recording ===
A Posteriori became the first Enigma album to be recorded using Michael Cretu's new 5.1 fully computerized mobile music studio, "Alchemist", a machine of relatively small size with a main keyboard and a number of hardware MIDI controllers with some "special" expansions and a central computer with LCD screen. The device was designed for Cretu privately.

=== Etymology ===
"A posteriori", a Latin phrase translated as "after the fact", refers to empirical knowledge, the epistemological concept of deriving knowledge from past experience.

"Eppur si muove", alternately spelled "E pur si muove!", is an Italian phrase translated to "And yet it moves", attributed to Galileo Galilei after he was sentenced by the Roman Inquisition to recant his belief in heliocentrism.

== Reception ==
Professional ratings
Review scores
Source	Rating
AllMusic	2.5/5 stars

Thom Jurek of AllMusic wrote, "[I]f you like the Enigma sound, this will be up your alley, full of the things you may seek out in a recording, but there is little new here."

== Track listing ==
=== Original release ===
All songs written, arranged, and produced by Michael Cretu.

No.	Title	Length
1.	"Eppur si muove"	3:41
2.	"Feel Me Heaven"	4:50
3.	"Dreaming of Andromeda"	4:26
4.	"Dancing with Mephisto"	4:25
5.	"Northern Lights"	3:39
6.	"Invisible Love"	4:55
7.	"Message from Io"	3:09
8.	"Hello and Welcome"	5:08
9.	"20.000 Miles over the Sea"	4:23
10.	"Sitting on the Moon"	4:21
11.	"The Alchemist"	4:41
12.	"Goodbye Milky Way"	5:58
Total length:		53:36

iTunes remix bonus tracks
No.	Title	Length
1.	""Eppur si muove" (Tocadisco Remix)"	6:39
2.	""Dreaming of Andromeda" (Jean F. Cochois Remix)"	7:28
3.	""20.000 Miles over the Sea" (Boca Junior Remix)"	7:07
4.	""The Alchemist" (The Alchemist's Vision by Ralf Hildenbeutel)"	7:17
Total length:		28:31

=== A Posteriori Private Lounge Remix ===
The Private Lounge Remix album version of A Posteriori was released via iTunes on 18 March 2007 in Germany and on 26 March in the rest of Europe.

No.	Title	Length
1.	"Eppur si muove" (Tocadisco remix 2)	6:11
2.	"Feel Me Heaven" (Boca Junior remix)	6:24
3.	"Dreaming of Andromeda" (Jean F. Cochois remix)	7:29
4.	"Dancing with Mephisto" (Boca Junior remix)	5:28
5.	"Northern Lights" (Boca Junior remix)	5:41
6.	"Invisible Love" (Boca Junior remix)	5:45
7.	"Message from Io" (Boca Junior remix)	5:33
8.	"The Alchemist" (Christian Geller remix)	6:54
9.	"20.000 Miles over the Sea" (Boca Junior remix)	7:08
10.	"Sitting on the Moon" (Boca Junior remix)	5:31
11.	"The Alchemist" (The Alchemist's Vision by Ralf Hildenbeutel)	7:16
12.	"Goodbye Milky Way" (Boca Junior remix)	5:10
Total length:		1:14:30

== Personnel ==
Enigma

- Michael Cretu – music, lyrics, vocals (tracks 6, 10, 12), performance, production, programming, engineering

Additional musicians

- Narration – Louisa Stanley (tracks 4, 12)
- Voice – Andru Donalds (track 8)

== Charts ==
=== Weekly charts ===
Weekly chart performance for A Posteriori
Chart (2006)	Peak position
Austrian Albums (Ö3 Austria)	17
Belgian Albums (Ultratop Flanders)	65
Belgian Albums (Ultratop Wallonia)	60
Czech Albums (ČNS IFPI)	34
Dutch Albums (Album Top 100)	8
French Albums (SNEP)	98
German Albums (Offizielle Top 100)	16
Greek Albums (IFPI)	17
Hungarian Albums (MAHASZ)	24
Italian Albums (FIMI)	32
Japanese Albums (Oricon)	144
Polish Albums (ZPAV)	44
Portuguese Albums (AFP)	28
Spanish Albums (Promusicae)	82
Swiss Albums (Schweizer Hitparade)	24
UK Albums (Official Charts)	115
US Billboard 200	95
US Top Dance/Electronic Albums (Billboard)	3

=== Year-end charts ===
2006 year-end chart performance for A Posteriori
Chart (2006)	Position
US Top Dance/Electronic Albums (Billboard)	21

2007 year-end chart performance for A Posteriori
Chart (2007)	Position
US Top Dance/Electronic Albums (Billboard)	17

== Certifications ==
Certifications for A Posteriori
Region	Certification	Certified units/sales
Russia (NFPF)	Platinum	20,000^{*}
^{*} Sales figures based on certification alone.

== Release history ==
Region	Date
Germany	22 September 2006
Worldwide	25 September 2006
