= The Rivers of Belief =

Single by Enigma

from the album MCMXC a.D.
- B-side: "Knocking on Forbidden Doors"
- Released: 7 October 1991
- Recorded: 1990
- Genre: New age
- Length: 4:24
- Label: Virgin
- Songwriters: Michael Cretu, Fabrice Jean Roger Cuitad
- Producer: Michael Cretu

Enigma singles chronology
| "Principles of Lust" (1991) | "The Rivers of Belief" (1991) | "Carly's Song" (1993) |

Music video
- "The Rivers of Belief" on YouTube

"The Rivers of Belief" is a song by the musical project Enigma, released on 7 October 1991 as the fourth and final single from the debut album MCMXC a.D..

On the album, the song is part three of the overarching song "Back to the Rivers of Belief", which includes the songs "Way to Eternity" and "Hallelujah", which then segues into "Rivers of Belief". The single version of the song starts with a sample of the intro to Bach's Toccata & Fugue in D minor and a spoken passage by Sandra, before picking up where the album version begins.

== Track listing ==
1. "The Rivers of Belief" (radio edit) – 4:24
2. "The Rivers of Belief" (extended version) – 7:49
3. "Knocking on Forbidden Doors" – 3:46

== Charts ==
- Australia #160
- Sweden #37
- UK #68
