= Push the Limits =

Single by Enigma

from the album The Screen Behind the Mirror
- Released: 17 April 2000
- Recorded: 1999
- Studio: A.R.T. Studios, Ibiza
- Genre: New age
- Length: 3:54
- Label: Virgin / EMI
- Songwriters: Michael Cretu, Jens Gad
- Producer: Michael Cretu

Enigma singles chronology
"Gravity of Love" (1999)	"Push the Limits" (2000)	"Turn Around" (2001)

Music video
- "Push the Limits" on YouTube

"Push the Limits" is a 2000 song created by the musical project, Enigma. The single was the second one released from The Screen Behind the Mirror.

== Single track listing ==
- 2-track CD single
1. "ATB Mix" – 8:30
2. "Album Version" – 6:25
- 2-track CD single
1. "Radio Edit" – 3:54
2. "ATB Radio Remix" – 3:35
- 3-track CD single
1. "Radio Edit"
2. "ATB Radio Remix"
3. "ATB Remix"
- 4-track CD single
1. "Radio Edit"
2. "ATB Remix"
3. "Album Version"
4. "ATB Radio Remix"
5. "Multimedia: The Video" (available on some versions)

== Chart positions ==
Chart (2000)	Peak position
Germany (GfK)	96
UK Singles (OCC)	76
