= Mea Culpa (Part II) =

1991 single by Enigma

Single by Enigma

from the album MCMXC a.D.
- B-side: "Communion: O sacrum convivium"
- Released: 1991
- Genre: New age
- Length: 4:30
- Label: Virgin
- Songwriters: Michael Cretu; Fabrice Cuitad
- Producer: Michael Cretu

Enigma singles chronology
| "Sadeness (Part I)" (1990) | "Mea Culpa (Part II)" (1991) | "Principles of Lust" (1991) |

Music video
- "Mea Culpa (Part II)" on YouTube

A Gregorian Kyrie from the mass XI (Orbis Factor) used in Mea Culpa.

"Mea Culpa (Part II)" is a song by German musical project Enigma. It was released in 1991 by Virgin Records as the second single from their debut album, MCMXC a.D. (1990). Like their previous single "Sadeness (Part I)", it is sung in French and Latin, though "Mea Culpa (Part II)" also has a line in English, "The time has come".

"Mea Culpa" was the project's second top-10 hit in their native Germany, reaching number seven, as well as reaching the top 10 in Belgium, Finland, France, Greece, Italy, Portugal, Spain and Switzerland. However, it failed to match the success of "Sadeness (Part I)" in many other countries, reaching number 20 in Ireland, number 59 in Canada and number 55 in both Australia and the United Kingdom. In the United States, the single failed to chart on the Billboard Hot, but reached number seven on the Billboard Dance Club Play chart. The accompanying music video for the song received heavy rotation on MTV Europe in March 1991. Two music videos were made, the first for the Orthodox version and the second for the Catholic version.

== Critical reception ==
Pan-European magazine Music & Media wrote, "Follow-up to the mega hit 'Sadeness Part I': this time there's also the choice of a Catholic mix. How long do we have to wait until Pope John-Paul II takes action?"

== Track listings ==
- 7-inch and CD single
1. "Mea Culpa Part II" (Orthodox version) – 3:58
2. "Mea Culpa Part II" (Catholic version) – 3:54
- 12-inch maxi
1. "Mea Culpa Part II" (Fading Shades mix) – 6:15
2. "Mea Culpa Part II" (Orthodox mix) – 3:58
3. "Mea Culpa Part II" (Catholic version) – 3:54
4. "Mea Culpa Part II" (LP version) – 5:05
5. "Communion: O sacrum convivium" – 4:42
- CD maxi
1. "Mea Culpa Part II" (Fading shades mix) – 6:15
2. "Mea Culpa Part II" (Orthodox mix) – 3:58
3. "Mea Culpa Part II" (Catholic version) – 3:54

== Charts ==
=== Weekly charts ===
| Chart (1991) | Peak position |
|---|---|
| Australia (ARIA) | 55 |
| Austria (Ö3 Austria Top 40) | 21 |
| Belgium (Ultratop 50 Flanders) | 9 |
| Canada Top Singles (RPM) | 59 |
| Europe (Eurochart Hot 100) | 47 |
| Europe (European Hit Radio) | 23 |
| Finland (Suomen virallinen lista) | 4 |
| France (SNEP) | 4 |
| Germany (GfK) | 7 |
| Greece (IFPI) | 2 |
| Ireland (IRMA) | 20 |
| Italy (Musica e dischi) | 4 |
| Netherlands (Dutch Top 40) | 16 |
| Netherlands (Single Top 100) | 11 |
| New Zealand (Recorded Music NZ) | 34 |
| Portugal (AFP) | 3 |
| Spain (AFYVE) | 7 |
| Sweden (Sverigetopplistan) | 20 |
| Switzerland (Schweizer Hitparade) | 10 |
| UK Singles (Official Charts) | 55 |
| UK Airplay (Music Week) | 42 |
| US 12-inch Singles Sales (Billboard) | 19 |
| US Dance Club Play (Billboard) | 7 |

=== Year-end charts ===
| Chart (1991) | Position |
|---|---|
| Belgium (Ultratop) | 89 |
| Europe (Eurochart Hot 100) | 47 |
| Germany (Media Control) | 69 |

== Certifications ==
| Region | Certification | Date | Sales certified |
|---|---|---|---|
| France | Silver | 1991 | 125,000 |

== Release history ==
| Region | Date | Format(s) | Label(s) | Ref. |
|---|---|---|---|---|
| Europe | 1991 | 7-inch vinyl; 12-inch vinyl; CD | Virgin | |
| United Kingdom | 18 March 1991 | 7-inch vinyl; 12-inch vinyl; CD; cassette | Virgin | |
| Australia | 22 April 1991 | 7-inch vinyl; 12-inch vinyl; CD | Virgin | |
| Japan | 21 June 1991 | Mini-album | Virgin | |
