= MCMXC a.D. =

Studio album by Enigma
- Released: 3 December 1990
- Recorded: 1988-1989
- Studios: A.R.T. (Ibiza, Spain)
- Genres: New-age; worldbeat; dance; pop
- Length: 40:16
- Languages: English; Latin; French
- Labels: Virgin; Charisma
- Producer: Michael Cretu

Enigma chronology
MCMXC a.D. (1990)	The Cross of Changes (1993)

Singles from MCMXC a.D.
- 1. "Sadeness (Part I)" Released: 1 October 1990; 2. "Mea Culpa (Part II)" Released: 1991; 3. "Principles of Lust" Released: 1991; 4. "The Rivers of Belief" Released: 1991

MCMXC a.D. (1990 AD in Roman numerals) is the debut studio album by the German musical project Enigma, led by the Romanian-German musician Michael Cretu. It was released in Europe by Virgin Records on 3 December 1990, and in the United States by Charisma Records on 12 February 1991. Cretu became fascinated with mixing archaic sounds with modern music after producing "Everlasting Love" by the German pop singer Sandra, for which he experimented with Gregorian chant. Following their marriage in 1988, Michael developed Enigma and recorded the album over the course of eight months in 1990 at A.R.T. Studios.

MCMXC a.D. combines new-age music with dance rhythms, Gregorian chant and themes of religion and sexuality, for which it received generally positive reviews. The Gregorian chant was sampled from recordings by Capella Antiqua München, which resulted in the Munich-based choir's label, Polydor Germany suing Cretu and Virgin Records for infringing on its "right of personality". The case was dropped after Cretu agreed to pay compensation.

MCMXC a.D. reached the top 10 on record charts in 10 countries, including the United States, where it stayed on the Billboard 200 chart for over five years. It was certified quadruple Platinum in the US by the Recording Industry Association of America (RIAA). "Sadeness (Part I)", "Mea Culpa (Part II)", "Principles of Lust" and "The Rivers of Belief" were released as singles. The lead single topped charts worldwide.

== Background and release ==
In 1987, Michael Cretu worked with Sandra on her song "Everlasting Love". Cretu experimented with Gregorian chant while working on the song with Sandra, and the chants appeared at the beginning of her song. He would become fascinated with incorporating archaic sounds into contemporary songs. Michael Cretu married Sandra in 1988 and came up with the idea of a new-age musical project, which would become known as "Enigma". MCMXC a.D. was recorded in 1990 in eight months at A.R.T. Studios, Cretu's studio located on the Spanish island of Ibiza. Cretu conceived the album as one continuous song; his philosophy when creating it was, "Contrary to the usual record-company philosophy, people are open-minded and starved for something unique." Cretu produced MCMXC a.D., with creative input from Frank Peterson and Fabrice Cuitad.

The first song recorded for the album was "Sadeness (Part I)". After making the song, Michael told Sandra Cretu, "This will be a huge hit or nothing at all." "Sadeness (Part I)" was released as a single on 1 October 1990. Michael Cretu wanted to be anonymous and wished for the single not to be promoted. He believed that it was not important for consumers to know who the producer is and wanted them to buy the single for the music itself. Due to this, he was credited as Curly M.C., (Note: "Curly" is the English meaning of the Romanian Cretu, and M.C. are his initials.) while Peterson was credited as F. Gregorian, (Note: F. Gregorian is short for Father Gregorian.) and Cuitad was credited as David Fairstein. Virgin Records promoted the song with radio and club-play only. Despite having virtually no promotion, "Sadeness (Part I)" became an international hit and reached number one in Germany faster than any previous new release, and prior to the completion of its music video.

MCMXC a.D. was released in Europe by Virgin Records on 3 December 1990, and in the United States by Charisma Records on 12 February 1991. Cretu still wanted to remain anonymous, believing that the consumers would buy the album for the music itself. The three producers were credited on MCMXC a.D. under the same monikers as on "Sadeness (Part I)".

== Composition and lyrics ==
=== Overview ===
MCMXC a.D. is 40 minutes and 16 seconds long and is divided into seven tracks, two of which contain three separate songs each. The track "Principles of Lust" contains "Sadeness", "Find Love", and "Sadeness (Reprise)"; and "Back to the Rivers of Belief" contains "Way to Eternity", "Hallelujah", and "The Rivers of Belief". The album encompasses a range of genres, including new-age, worldbeat, and pop music; and it utilizes hip-hop and dance rhythms. The album is well known for its mixing of Gregorian chant and other religious overtones with sexuality; the lead single, "Sadeness (Part I)", being the prime example. It is a common misconception that, because "Sadeness (Part I)" employs Gregorian chants, the entire album contains such chants. In debunking this notion, Cretu stated that "'Sadeness' is only one piece of the puzzle." Larry Flick from Billboard further clarified, saying that "Mea Culpa" maintains the atmosphere of "Sadeness", but "without the aid of Gregorian chants." According to the Journal of Religion and Health, MCMXC a.D. follows the narrative of facing one's demons and making peace with them.

=== Songs ===
"The Voice of Enigma" was written solely by Cretu, and starts with a foghorn sound that is known as the "Enigma horn". After the foghorn, Louisa Stanley (an executive at Virgin Records at the time) starts talking and invites the listener to relax and take a deep breath, while an environmental soundscape plays in the background. "The Principles of Lust" track employs a drumbeat throughout similar to the R&B 1989 song "Keep On Movin'" by Soul II Soul, flute synth lines, and Cretu's whispers and "orgasmic breathing" that mark the song breaks. The first part, "Sadeness", includes a Gregorian chant taken from the track "Procedamus in pace!" from the 1976 album Paschale Mysterium by Capella Antiqua München. It also includes contributions from Fabrice Cuitad and Peterson. The song's French lyrics are a quizzical look at, and defense of, the 18th-century writer Marquis de Sade, who was notorious for writing literature delving into themes of sexual violence and domination.

"Callas Went Away" was written solely by Michael Cretu, and samples Maria Callas's singing. "Mea Culpa" was written by Cretu and Fabrice Cuitad and is a follow-up to "Sadeness". Like "Sadeness", "Mea Culpa" samples Gregorian chant from the Capella Antiqua München and thus evokes the same atmosphere. The song's theme "centers around guilt", according to the official Enigma website. "The Voice & the Snake" is based on the Book of Revelation and was sampled from "The Seven Bowls," which is the eighth track on the final album of the prog-rock band Aphrodite's Child, 666, released in 1972. "Knocking on Forbidden Doors" was written solely by Cretu. The "Back to the Rivers of Belief" track's three songs were mainly written by Cretu, with the song "The Rivers of Belief"—which centers around the Indian river Ganges and differs from the other songs in being more soulful—including contributions from Fabrice Cuitad.

== Singles ==
Four songs from MCMXC a.D. were released as singles. "Sadeness (Part I)", known as "Sadeness" on the album and the first part of "The Principles of Lust" track, was released as the lead single on 1 October 1990. The single has sold at least 7 million copies worldwide, and was the fastest German single to reach number one, the week of 12 November 1990. The Los Angeles Times reported that the single reached number one in at least 14 other countries. "Mea Culpa (Part II)", known as "Mea Culpa" on the album, was released as the second single in early 1991 and reached number seven on both the German chart and on the Billboard Dance Club Songs chart. The song charted at number four in France, and received a gold certification from the French National Syndicate of Phonographic Publishing (SNEP). Cretu considers "Mea Culpa (Part II)" his favorite song from the album. "Principles of Lust" and "The Rivers of Belief" were both as singles released in 1991. The "Principles of Lust" single is a reworking of the song "Find Love". The single charted at number 90 in Germany, number 59 in the UK, and number 29 in France. "The Rivers of Belief" single is the third song of the "Back to the Rivers of Belief" album track. The single charted in the United Kingdom at number 68, and in Sweden at number 37.

== Critical reception ==
Professional ratings
Review scores
Source	Rating
AllMusic	4/5 stars
Calgary Herald	B
Colorado Springs Magazine	A
Entertainment Weekly	A−
NME	6/10
The Village Voice	C−
The Great Rock Discography	6/10

MCMXC a.D. was met with generally positive reviews from music critics. Danny Serbib of Colorado Springs Magazine said that by adding Gregorian chant to the album, "[Cretu had] redefined the possible future of popular music." Mikko Stübner-Lankuttis from Deutsche Welle put MCMXC a.D. at number one on his "The Top 10 albums from Germany", saying "His combination of new-age sounds with dance beats regularly took the project to the top of the international charts."

AllMusic critic Ned Raggett said, "Michael Crétu's attempt at fusing everything from easy listening sex music and hip-hop rhythms to centuries-old Gregorian chants could not have been more designed to tweak the nose of high art." Marisa Fox wrote, for Entertainment Weekly, that while the album doesn't have as many accessible hits as other ones, "[the] journey through what the group calls 'music, spirit, and meditation' is entrancing as well as provocative."

In contrast, Brian Bourke, in the Syracuse Herald-Journal, stated that "once the novelty of Enigma's approach wears off", the rhythms underneath the songs have a sameness that is "irritating" in his eyes, with the exception of "The Rivers of Belief". The Village Voice critic Robert Christgau asserted that the "mellow electrobeat and Gregorian fog" of "Sadeness (Part I)" "provide[s] mutual relief", and suggested the other songs are disco filler with sexual content that is too lacking in vulgarity for his tastes.

== Commercial performance ==
MCMXC a.D. was a worldwide commercial success. According to The New York Times, the album had sold 12 million copies worldwide as of February 1994. In Germany, MCMXC a.D. entered the German Albums chart at number 60 for the week of 10 December 1990. It peaked at number three for the week of 24 December 1990 and left after appearing at number 72 for the week of 8 July 1991. The album re-entered the chart at number 68 for the week of 21 February 1994 and left after appearing at number 69 for the week of 21 March 1991. MCMXC a.D. re-entered the German Albums chart at number 80 for the week of 9 December 1996 and left after appearing at number 73 for the week of 13 January 1997. The album spent 46 weeks on the German chart, and has been certified double platinum by the Bundesverband Musikindustrie (BVMI), indicating shipments in excess of one million copies in Germany.

In the US, MCMXC a.D. entered the Billboard 200 at number 169 for the week of 2 March 1991. It stayed on the Billboard 200 for 262 weeks, (Note: The ninth longest time an album has ever been on the Billboard 200.) peaking at number six for the week of 3 May 1991. On the US Top Catalog Albums chart, MCMXC a.D. peaked at number four for the week of 10 May 1997. The album has since been certified quadruple platinum by the Recording Industry Association of America (RIAA), denoting shipments in excess of four million copies in the US. In March 2013, Nielsen Soundscan reported a 4,784,320 individual copies sold in the US.

MCMXC a.D. topped the UK Albums Chart for the week of 20 January 1991, spending 60 weeks on the chart. The album has since been certified triple platinum by the British Phonographic Industry (BPI) for shipments in excess of 900,000 copies in the UK. Elsewhere, MCMXC a.D. reached number one in Belgium, Greece, Portugal, and Spain; number two in Australia, New Zealand, and Switzerland; number three in Austria, Canada, and Sweden; number four in Ireland and Norway; and number seven in the Netherlands.

== Controversies ==
=== Satanism rumors ===
Following the release of MCMXC a.D., Cretu has experienced accusations of including Satanic content on the album. This resulted in many Catholic-backed radio stations in Europe banning "Sadeness (Part I)" from being played. While most of the press did not think that MCMXC a.D had Satanic implications, Charisma Records issued a press release denying such claims. Cretu stated that he did not mean for there to be any implications of Satanism with the album, revealing he wanted the combination of Gregorian chant and lyrics relating to the Marquis de Sade to be seen as a paradox.

=== Lawsuit ===
In a 1990 interview with Verdens Gang, Cretu claimed that the Gregorian chants used on MCMXC a.D. were recorded in Romania and said that the singers were given their share of the "D-marks" Cretu got from "Sadeness" and the album. This proved to be false; in 1991 Capella Antiqua München, a Munich-based choir, recognized a sample of one of their recordings on MCMXC a.D. Their label, Polydor Germany, sued Cretu and Virgin Records for infringing on its "right of personality" in using the Gregorian chant samples in "Sadeness (Part I)" and "Mea Culpa". The lawsuit was settled out of court after Virgin publicly apologized for the infringement and Cretu agreed to pay compensation to the original creator of the samples. (Note: The case did not cover copyright infringement, as the Kapelle Antiqua recordings were in the public domain.)

== Track listing ==
1990 original version
No.	Title	Writer(s)	Length
1.	"The Voice of Enigma"	Curly M.C.	2:21
2.	"Principles of Lust" (a. "Sadeness"; b. "Find Love"; c. "Sadeness (Reprise)")	Curly M.C.; David Fairstein; F. Gregorian	11:43
3.	"Callas Went Away"	Curly M.C.	4:27
4.	"Mea Culpa"	Curly M.C.; Fairstein	5:03
5.	"The Voice & the Snake"	Curly M.C.; Gregorian	1:39
6.	"Knocking on Forbidden Doors"	Curly M.C.	4:31
7.	"Back to the Rivers of Belief" (a. "Way to Eternity"; b. "Hallelujah"; c. "The Rivers of Belief")	Curly M.C.; Fairstein	10:32
Total length:			40:16

1991 "The Limited Edition"
No.	Title	Writer(s)	Length
1.	"Sadeness (Meditation)"	Curly M.C.; Gregorian; Fairstein	2:43
2.	"Mea Culpa (Fading Shades)"	Curly M.C.; Fairstein	6:04
3.	"Principles of Lust (Everlasting Lust)"	Curly M.C.	4:50
4.	"The Rivers of Belief (The Returning Silence)"	Curly M.C.; Fairstein	7:04
Total length:			20:41

== Personnel ==
Credits adapted from the liner notes of MCMXC a.D.

- Michael Cretu (credited as "Curly M.C.") (all tracks) (Note: The MCMXC a.D. liner notes do not state what his role in the album was, but the "Sadeness (Part I)" liner notes give his role as "Music".)
- Frank Peterson (credited as "F. Gregorian") (tracks 2a, 2c, and 5)
- Fabrice Cuitad (credited as "David Fairstein") (tracks 2a, 2c, 4, and 7c) (Note: The MCMXC a.D. liner notes do not state what his role in the album was, but the "Sadeness (Part I)" liner notes give his role as "Text".)
- Sandra Cretu (uncredited) (tracks 2a, 2c, and 4)
- Louisa Stanley (uncredited) (track 1)

== Charts ==
=== Weekly charts ===
1990–1991 weekly chart performance for MCMXC a.D.
Chart (1990–1991)	Peak position
Australian Albums (ARIA)	2
Austrian Albums (Ö3 Austria)	3
Belgian Albums (IFPI)	1
Canada Top Albums/CDs (RPM)	3
Danish Albums (Hitlisten)	10
Dutch Albums (Album Top 100)	7
European Albums (Music & Media)	2
Finnish Albums (Suomen virallinen lista)	5
French Albums (SNEP)	1
German Albums (Offizielle Top 100)	3
Greek Albums (IFPI)	1
Irish Albums (IFPI)	4
Italian Albums (Musica e dischi)	6
New Zealand Albums (RMNZ)	2
Norwegian Albums (VG-lista)	4
Portuguese Albums (UNEVA)	1
Spanish Albums (AFYVE)	1
Swedish Albums (Sverigetopplistan)	3
Swiss Albums (Schweizer Hitparade)	2
UK Albums (Official Charts)	1
US Billboard 200	6

1997 weekly chart performance for MCMXC a.D.
Chart (1997)	Peak position
US Top Catalog Albums (Billboard)	4

1998 weekly chart performance for MCMXC a.D.
Chart (1998)	Peak position
French Albums (SNEP)	62

=== Year-end charts ===
1991 year-end chart performance for MCMXC a.D.
Chart (1991)	Position
Australian Albums (ARIA)	26
Austrian Albums (Ö3 Austria)	29
Canada Top Albums/CDs (RPM)	24
Dutch Albums (Album Top 100)	47
European Albums (Music & Media)	7
German Albums (Offizielle Top 100)	24
New Zealand Albums (RMNZ)	11
Swiss Albums (Schweizer Hitparade)	14
UK Albums (OCC)	34
US Billboard 200	41

1994 year-end chart performance for MCMXC a.D.
Chart (1994)	Position
Australian Albums (ARIA)	98
New Zealand Albums (RMNZ)	45
US Billboard 200	93

== Certifications ==
Certifications and sales for MCMXC a.D.
Region	Certification	Certified units/sales
Argentina (CAPIF)	Gold	30,000^{^}
Australia (ARIA)	3× Platinum	210,000^{^}
Austria (IFPI Austria)	Gold	25,000^{*}
Brazil (Pro-Música Brasil)	Gold	100,000^{*}
Canada (Music Canada)	2× Platinum	200,000^{^}
France (SNEP)	2× Platinum	600,000^{*}
Germany (BVMI)	2× Platinum	1,000,000^{^}
Netherlands (NVPI)	Platinum	100,000^{^}
New Zealand (RMNZ)	Gold	7,500^{^}
Spain (Promusicae)	Platinum	100,000^{^}
Sweden (GLF)	Gold	50,000^{^}
Switzerland (IFPI Switzerland)	2× Platinum	100,000^{^}
United Kingdom (BPI)	3× Platinum	900,000^{^}
United States (RIAA)	4× Platinum	4,000,000^{^}
^{*} Sales figures based on certification alone.^{^} Shipments figures based on certification alone.
