= Gravity of Love =

1999 single by Enigma

Single by Enigma

from the album The Screen Behind the Mirror
- Released: 22 November 1999
- Studio: A.R.T. (Ibiza, Spain)
- Length: 3:58
- Label: Virgin
- Songwriters: Michael Cretu, Carl Orff
- Producer: Michael Cretu

Enigma singles chronology
"T.N.T. for the Brain" (1997)	"Gravity of Love" (1999)	"Push the Limits" (2000)

Music video
- "Gravity of Love" on YouTube

"Gravity of Love" is a song by the German musical group Enigma. It was released in November 1999 as the lead single from the album The Screen Behind the Mirror. The song features guest vocals by Ruth-Ann Boyle of the British band Olive and has samples from Carl Orff's Carmina Burana. The beat in the song originates from Led Zeppelin's rendition of "When the Levee Breaks", which was also used in the song "Return to Innocence".

== Music video ==
In the music video for the song, which is set in the 1930s, a masquerade ball is being held in a mansion, while passion starts to run high for some of the participants. The video was filmed on location in the Villa Wagner I (designed by the famous architect Otto Wagner) in Penzing, a district in Vienna, Austria. The director for the video is Thomas Job. The setting is reminiscent of the 1961 film L'année dernière à Marienbad and some scenes from Stanley Kubrick's 1999 film Eyes Wide Shut.

== Charts ==
Chart (1999–2000)	Peak position
Germany (GfK)	65
Hungary (Mahasz)	4
Netherlands (Single Top 100)	84
Switzerland (Schweizer Hitparade)	89
