= Voyageur (Enigma album) =

2003 studio album by Enigma

Studio album by Enigma
- Released: 8 September 2003
- Recorded: 2003
- Studios: A.R.T. (Ibiza, Spain)
- Genres: Europop; new-age; ambient; electronic; experimental
- Length: 47:18
- Label: Virgin
- Producer: Michael Cretu

Enigma chronology
Love Sensuality Devotion: The Remix Collection (2001)	Voyageur (2003)	15 Years After (2005)

Professional ratings
Review scores
Source	Rating
AllMusic	3.5/5 stars

Voyageur is the fifth studio album by the German musical project Enigma, released on 8 September 2003 by Virgin Records.

Voyageur was considered to be Enigma's most distinctive album to date, due to Enigma's drastic changes in sound as compared to the previous four albums. The project's signature shakuhachi flutes, Gregorian chants and tribal chants found on the earlier albums were all but gone on Voyageur. Instead, most of the songs found on the album were more pop-oriented, such as "Voyageur", "Incognito", "Boum-Boum" and "Look of Today"; the latter of which interpolates the chorus of ABC's "The Look of Love". Michael Cretu described Voyageur's genre as "sophisticated pop". Only a few samples of previous works are retained; a familiar reversed cymbal rhythm appears in "Look of Today", while "Incognito" contains the chorus of previous single "Sadeness" buried in the bridge of the song. The "Enigma foghorn" also appears at the opening of the record.

== Release ==
Voyageur was released on the CD and cassette formats, while the CD cover art (done by Johann Zambryski) has two different versions:

- A normal version with full paper inserts (which can be harder to find compared to the "special package" edition);
- A "special package" edition with a transparent CD cover, with the album art printed on the inside of the CD case and partly on the CD itself, and a ring-shaped booklet placed under the CD.

In May 2018, the album received its first vinyl release as part of The Colours of Enigma series of reissues, which includes all other Enigma studio albums.

== Track listing ==
All music is composed by Michael Cretu, except where noted.

No.	Title	Lyrics	Music	Length
1.	"From East to West"			4:11
2.	"Voyageur"	Cretu	Cretu; Jens Gad	4:36
3.	"Incognito"	Cretu		4:23
4.	"Page of Cups"		Cretu; Gad	7:01
5.	"Boum-Boum"	Cretu		4:29
6.	"Total Eclipse of the Moon"	Cretu		2:16
7.	"Look of Today"	Cretu		3:43
8.	"In the Shadow, in the Light"	Cretu		5:35
9.	"Weightless"	Cretu		2:15
10.	"The Piano"		Cretu; Gad	3:00
11.	"Following the Sun"	Cretu		5:49
Total length:				47:18

== Personnel ==
Credits adapted from the liner notes of Voyageur.

- Ruth-Ann Boyle – lead vocals (tracks 5, 11)
- Andru Donalds – lead vocals (tracks 5, 8)
- Michael Cretu – lead vocals (tracks 3, 6, 7, 9, 11); arrangements, engineering, production (all tracks)
- Sandra Cretu – female voices
- Jens Gad – arrangements, engineering, guitars
- Johann Zambryski – artwork

== Charts ==
=== Weekly charts ===
Weekly chart performance for Voyageur
Chart (2003)	Peak position
Austrian Albums (Ö3 Austria)	19
Belgian Albums (Ultratop Flanders)	39
Belgian Albums (Ultratop Wallonia)	39
Czech Albums (ČNS IFPI)	20
Dutch Albums (Album Top 100)	13
Finnish Albums (Suomen virallinen lista)	34
French Albums (SNEP)	32
German Albums (Offizielle Top 100)	6
Hungarian Albums (MAHASZ)	29
Italian Albums (FIMI)	17
Portuguese Albums (AFP)	4
Scottish Albums (Official Charts)	69
Spanish Albums (AFYVE)	87
Swedish Albums (Sverigetopplistan)	31
Swiss Albums (Schweizer Hitparade)	29
UK Albums (Official Charts)	46
US Billboard 200	94
US Top Dance/Electronic Albums (Billboard)	1

=== Year-end charts ===
2003 year-end chart performance for Voyageur
Chart (2003)	Position
US Top Dance/Electronic Albums (Billboard)	13

2004 year-end chart performance for Voyageur
Chart (2004)	Position
US Top Dance/Electronic Albums (Billboard)	13

== Certifications ==
Certifications for Voyageur
Region	Certification	Certified units/sales
Russia (NFPF)	Gold	10,000^{*}
^{*} Sales figures based on certification alone.
