= Principles of Lust =

- The cover includes a detail from the painting Venus, Cupid, Folly and Time by Agnolo Bronzino.

Single by Enigma

from the album MCMXC a.D.
- Released: 1991
- Recorded: 1990
- Studio: A.R.T. Studios, Ibiza
- Genre: New age
- Length: 3:25
- Label: Virgin
- Songwriter: Michael Cretu
- Producer: Michael Cretu

Enigma singles chronology
"Mea Culpa (Part II)" (1991)	"Principles of Lust" (1991)	"The Rivers of Belief" (1991)

Music video
- "Principles of Lust" on YouTube

"Principles of Lust" is a 1991 song created by musical project Enigma. It was released as the third single from their debut album, MCMXC a.D. (1990). On the album, "Principles of Lust" is a multi-part song consisting of two versions of "Sadeness" with "Find Love" in between. The single version is a remix of "Find Love" with some additional instrumentation.

== Critical reception ==
Pan-European magazine Music & Media wrote, "The church choir hit-team changes the tempo way down low. Combined with Sandra's vocals and sighs plus some strange bubbling sounds, it should work wonders again."

== Track listings ==
- CD single, UK
1. "Principles of Lust" (radio edit) – 3:25
2. "Principles of Lust" (Omen mix) – 5:52
3. "Principles of Lust" (Jazz mix) – 3:06
4. "Sadeness (radio edit)" – 4:17
- CD single, US
1. "Principles of Lust" (radio edit) – 3:25
2. "Principles of Lust" (Everlasting Lust mix) – 5:09
3. "Principles of Lust" (album version) – 4:20
4. "Principles of Lust" (Jazz mix) – 3:06
- CD single, Japan
1. "Principles of Lust" (radio edit) – 3:25
2. "Principles of Lust" (Everlasting Lust mix) – 5:09
3. "Principles of Lust" (The Omen mix) – 5:52
4. "Sadeness" (Meditation mix) – 3:04

== Charts ==
Chart (1991)	Peak position
Australia (ARIA)	111
Finland (Suomen virallinen lista)	22
France (SNEP)	29
Germany (Official German Charts)	90
UK Singles (OCC)	59
