= Will to Power discography =

- Studio albums: 3
- Extended plays: 1
- Compilation albums: 1
- Singles: 8

Will to Power is an American dance-pop group that originated in southern Florida in the mid-1980s. The group recorded a number of hit singles on the Billboard dance and pop charts in the late 1980s and early 1990s, most notably "Baby, I Love Your Way/Freebird Medley", a medley of 1970s hits by Peter Frampton and Lynyrd Skynyrd that reached the top of the Billboard Hot 100 chart in December 1988.

While signed to Epic Records, they released their self-titled debut album in 1988, however, it only charted at #68 on the Billboard 200, despite charting two top 50 singles, along with Will to Power's only number one single on the Billboard Hot 100, "Baby, I Love Your Way/Freebird Medley".

== Albums ==
=== Studio albums ===
List of albums, with selected chart positions
Title	Album details	Peak chart positions		
Title	Album details	US	AUS	NOR
Will to Power	First studio album; Release date: March 1988; Label: Epic Records	68	106	8
Journey Home	Second studio album; Release date: 1990; Label: Epic Records	178	119	—
Spirit Warrior	Third studio album; Release date: 2005; Label: Straight Blast Records	—	—	—
"—" denotes releases that did not chart or were not released to that country

=== Compilation albums ===
Title	Album details
Love Power	Release date: 1996; Label: Sony BMG

== Extended plays ==
Title	EP details
Spirit Warrior – The Remixes EP	Release date: May 23, 2006; Label: Straight Blast

== Singles ==
List of singles, with selected chart positions, showing year released and album name
Year	Title	Peak chart positions									Certifications (sales threshold)	Album
Year	Title	US	US Dance	US AC	AUS	IRE	NL	NOR	NZ	UK	Certifications (sales threshold)	Album
1987	"Dreamin'"	50	15	—	—	—	—	—	—	—		Will to Power
1988	"Say It's Gonna Rain"	49	1	—	—	—	—	—	—	—		Will to Power
1988	"Baby, I Love Your Way/Freebird Medley"	1	—	2	20	3	26	1	6	6	US: Gold	Will to Power
1989	"Fading Away"	65	1	—	153	—	—	—	—	84		Will to Power
1990	"I'm Not in Love"	7	—	4	38	27	—	8	15	29		Journey Home
1991	"Boogie Nights"	—	—	—	—	—	—	—	—	—		Journey Home
1991	"Fly Bird"	—	—	—	—	—	60	—	—	—		Journey Home
2005	"Spirit in the Bottle"	—	—	—	—	—	—	—	—	—		Spirit Warrior: The Remixes
2005	"Dreamin'" (re-issue)	—	—	—	—	—	—	—	—	—		Spirit Warrior: The Remixes
"—" denotes releases that did not chart or were not released to that country
