= Uncle Joe (film) =

1941 film by Howard M. Railsback and Raymond E. Swartley

- Directed by: Raymond E. Swartley; Howard M. Railsback
- Screenplay by: Al Weeks
- Story by: Glenn Rohrbach
- Produced by: Howard M. Railsback
- Starring: Slim Summerville; Zasu Pitts; Gale Storm
- Cinematography: Harry Neumann
- Edited by: Arthur Roberts
- Music by: Marvin Hatley
- Production company: Wilding Picture Productions
- Distributed by: Monogram Pictures
- Release date: October 18, 1941
- Running time: 51 minutes
- Country: United States
- Language: English

Uncle Joe is a 1941 American comedy film directed by Howard M. Railsback and Raymond E. Swartley and starring Gale Storm, ZaSu Pitts and Slim Summerville. It was a second feature distributed by Monogram Pictures.

== Plot ==
When big city girl Clare Day starts seeing a modernistic artist of whom her father disapproves, she is sent to visit her mother's brother Joe in rural "Baysville", Iowa. The four boys who live next door to Uncle Joe remember Clare as a skinny little girl and are shocked by how grown-up she has become. Eagerly, they all vie for her attention. Uncle Joe himself is stuck in a romance of the past and fails to hear that his sweetheart Julia Jordan is going to lose her house if she can't pay the mortgage. Clare and Bill, one of the four fellows next door, construct a means to save the day.

== Cast ==
- Slim Summerville as Uncle Joe
- Zasu Pitts as Aunt Julia
- Gale Storm as Clare
- William Davidson as J.K. Day
- Dorothy Peterson as Margaret Day
- Dick Hogan as Bill
- Frank Coghlan, Jr. as Dick
- James Butler as Bob
- Maynard Holmes as Skinny
- Brenda Henderson as Ann
- Howard Hickman as Banker Jones
- John Holland as Paul Darcey

Uncredited (in order of appearance)

John Maxwell	Radio announcer
Frank O'Connor	Limericks judge
Lynton Brent	Limericks judge

== Cast notes ==
Uncle Joe was the 13th of 14 features that starred or co-starred the screen team of Slim Summerville and Zasu Pitts. They had no scenes together in their first film, the silent version of All Quiet on the Western Front, and supporting roles in the next three films, but were starred in their fifth feature, 1932's The Unexpected Father, with their names and faces on the poster indicating their above-the-title status. Over the following 16 months in 1932–1934, they starred in five additional features for Universal and one more, also in 1934, for RKO. During the next seven years they continued steadily appearing in separate features and were reteamed for their final three films, including Uncle Joe, in 1941.

Gale Storm began her screen career at the age of 18 with minor roles in two 1940 films. The following year she appeared in seven features, including Uncle Joe. With the exception of 1944, she was seen in films released every year through 1952, for a total of 35 features, moving at that point to television as the sitcom star of My Little Margie in 1952 and The Gale Storm Show in 1956.

Uncle Joe was her eighth feature and she received third billing, behind Slim Summerville and Zasu Pitts. Fifteen years later, she was reteamed with Zasu Pitts for the 126-episode 1956–1960 run of The Gale Storm Show in which she played an ocean liner cruise director, with Pitts as the ship's manicurist who is continually talked into becoming the reluctant participant in her adventures and accomplice in her schemes to outwit the ship's irritable captain.

== Bibliography ==
- Fetrow, Alan G. Feature Films, 1940-1949: a United States Filmography. McFarland, 1994.
