= Outlaw (Olive song) =

Single by Olive

from the album Extra Virgin
- Released: August 1997
- Genre: Trip hop
- Length: 3:53 (radio edit)
- Label: RCA
- Songwriters: Tim Kellett; Robin Taylor-Firth
- Producers: Kellett; Taylor-Firth

Olive singles chronology
"You're Not Alone" (1996)	"Outlaw" (1997)	"I'm Not In Love" (2000)

"Outlaw" is a song written by Tim Kellett and Robin Taylor-Firth, and performed by British trip hop group Olive on their 1996 album Extra Virgin. It was released in August 1997 by RCA as the follow-up to the group's number one single "You're Not Alone". The single charted at number fourteen in the UK Singles Chart.

== Lyrics ==
The lyric concerns a woman's discovery that her boyfriend has been sleeping with another man. The main chorus couplet - "Couldn't you have told me before? / I would have loved you so much more" - suggests that her problem is not so much that her boyfriend is gay or bisexual, but simply that he lied to her about himself, and that under other circumstances they could have been good friends.

== Critical reception ==
A reviewer from Music Week gave the song three out of five, adding, "Nowhere near as ear-grabbing as its chart-topping predecessor, this is pleasant but too losely formed to make any lasting impact." Music Week editor Alan Jones wrote, "Their new single 'Outlaw' is quite different, and quite charming, with the most subdued drum & beats fused to a probing bassline overlaid with Ruth-Ann's sweet vocals." Kirstin Watson from Smash Hits also gave it three out of five, saying, "It's a cool song, but I don't reckon it's gonna get the nation quite as hooked as the last one. 'Outlaw''s got a tres catchy little middle bit and it the type of song you'll probably find yourself singing without realising what it is."

== Track listing ==
- UK CD single
1. "Outlaw" (Radio Edit)
2. "Outlaw" (Black Olive's Extended Mix)
3. "Outlaw" (Phunk Phorce Mix)
4. "Outlaw" (The Space Brothers Remix)
5. "Outlaw" (Billy Gonzo's Dogg Mix)
