= Miracle (Olive song) =

Single by Olive

from the album Extra Virgin
- Released: June 1996 (UK original release) March 1997 (UK re-release) November 1997 (UK second re-release)
- Genre: Dance
- Length: 3:53 (Radio Edit)
- Label: RCA
- Songwriters: Tim Kellett, Robin Taylor-Firth
- Producers: Kellett, Taylor-Firth

Olive singles chronology
"Miracle" (1996)	"You're Not Alone" (1996)

"Miracle" is the debut single by Olive, from their 1996 debut album Extra Virgin. The song was written by band members Tim Kellett and Robin Taylor-Firth. It was originally released in 1996 but was re-released in 1997 including a new UK Radio Edit that was different from the version that appears on the album.

The song was featured on the soundtrack to the 1998 movie Sliding Doors.

== Track listing ==
- UK CD single
1. "Miracle" (Radio Edit)
2. "Miracle" (Black Olive's 12" Mix)
3. "Miracle" (Monkey Mafia Remix)
4. "Miracle" (Doc Scott Remix)
5. "Miracle" (Black Olive Deeper Dub)
- UK re-release CD single
1. "Miracle" (Radio Edit)
2. "Miracle" (Black Olive's Extended Mix)
3. "Miracle" (Deep Dish Miracle of Dub Mix)
4. "Miracle" (Monkey Mafia Remix)
5. "Miracle" (Roni Size Remix)
6. "Miracle" (Black Olive's Deeper Dub)
- UK second re-release CD1
1. "Miracle" (Radio Edit)
2. "Miracle" (Murk Club Mix)
3. "Miracle" (Funky Green Mix)
4. "Miracle" (Beloved Club Vocal Mix)
5. "Miracle" (187 Lockdown's Deep Dub)
- UK second re-release CD2
1. "Miracle" (Radio Edit)
2. "Miracle" (Roni Size Remix)
3. "You're Not Alone" (Oakenfold / Osborne Remix)
4. "Killing"

== Charts ==
Chart (1997)	Peak position
Irish Singles Chart	100
UK Singles Chart	41
U.S. Billboard Hot Dance Club Songs	10
