= Trickle =

Studio album by Olive
- Released: 30 May 2000
- Studio: The Tree House, Derbyshire; Britannia Row, London; Area 21, London; The Square Centre, Nottingham
- Genre: Trip hop
- Length: 59:05
- Label: Maverick
- Producer: Tim Kellett; Roger Lyons; Peter John Vettesse

Olive chronology
Extra Virgin (1996)	Trickle (2000)

Singles from Trickle
- 1. "I'm Not in Love" Released: 27 June 2000

Professional ratings
Aggregate scores
Source	Rating
Metacritic	68/100
Review scores
Source	Rating
AllMusic	4.5/5 stars

Trickle is the second and final studio album by English trip hop band Olive, released on 30 May 2000 by Maverick Records.

== History ==
Following the band's debut album Extra Virgin and a subsequent promotional tour, keyboard programmer Robin Taylor-Firth left the band. Also during this time the UK arm of record label RCA lost interest in supporting the band; as a result, Olive was dropped from the RCA roster.

By this time, the follow-up album had been completed, including a cover of the 1975 UK number-one single "I'm Not in Love" by 10cc (chosen partially as an attempt to obtain better favour with RCA). However, Olive then signed with Maverick Records, after reportedly being discovered by label founder Madonna when she attended one of their concerts in Germany; initially, the band were recruited for a contribution to the soundtrack to the Madonna film The Next Best Thing, and a recording contract resulted from the contact.

"I'm Not in Love" became the band's contribution to the February 2000-released soundtrack, and Trickle was subsequently released in May; "I'm Not in Love" then also became the lead single (and only single) released from the album in June.

== Track listing ==
Trickle track listing
No.	Title	Writer(s)	Length
1.	"Love Affair"	Tim Kellett	3:58
2.	"Trickle"	Kellett	4:55
3.	"I'm Not in Love"	Graham Gouldman; Eric Stewart	4:40
4.	"Smile"	Peter-John Vettese; Kellett; Ruth-Ann Boyle	4:23
5.	"All You Ever Needed"	Kellett; Boyle	4:25
6.	"Indulge Me"	Kellett; Boyle	4:10
7.	"Speak to Me"	Kellett	4:06
8.	"Liberty"	Kellett	4:17
9.	"Push"	Kellett	4:45
10.	"Trust You"	Kellett; Boyle	3:49
11.	"Creature of Comfort"	Kellett	4:06
12.	"Beyond the Fray"	Kellett	4:19

Hidden track
No.	Title	Writer(s)	Length
13.	"Take My Hand"	Kellett; Boyle; Tony Foster	4:13
Total length:			59:02

== Personnel ==
Olive

- Ruth-Ann Boyle – vocals
- Tim Kellett – keyboards, trumpet, flugelhorn

Other musicians

- Guy Davie – mastering
- Mark "Tufty" Evans – mix engineer
- Tony Foster – acoustic guitar, electric guitar
- Robin Guthrie – guitar
- Ian Kirkham – EWI
- Vinnie Lammi – drums
- Roger Lyons – programming, additional keyboards
- Wil Malone – string arrangements
- James McNichol – assistant engineer
- Vini Reilly – guitar
- Steve Sidwell – Nyman Orchestra arrangements

Ian Kirkham was a member of Simply Red alongside Kellett (and remains a member to date). Vini Reilly is the leader of The Durutti Column, which Kellett played in during the 1980s.
