= The Next Best Thing (disambiguation) =

The Next Best Thing is a 2000 romantic comedy film.

The Next Best Thing may also refer to:

- The Next Best Thing (TV series), a 2007 American reality television series
- The Next Best Thing, a 2004 album by Ray Wilson (musician)
- The Next Best Thing (soundtrack), a 2000 soundtrack of the film, released by Madonna and various artists
