= The Power of Four =

Song written by Neil Myers

Song by Melody Music Lions Choir
- Language: English
- Published: 2005
- Songwriter: Neil Myers
- Composer: Neil Myers

"The Power of Four" is a joint anthem composed for the British & Irish Lions rugby union team. It was written by Neil Myers in 2005. It was commissioned by the Lions head coach, Sir Clive Woodward for the 2005 British & Irish Lions tour to New Zealand as the official song. It was intended to be a universal anthem for the British & Irish Lions to be sung before every game. However it was criticised as being uninspiring as members of the Lions squad did not engage with it and it was also noted that the fans did not like it. It was dropped as the Lions anthem after the 2005 tour and led to changes in the way music would be chosen in future Lions tours.

== Background ==
The Lions were originally a representative team of the United Kingdom of Great Britain and Ireland. Following the establishment of home rule for Ireland, players from the Irish Free State – and later, the Republic of Ireland – remained eligible for the team, even after the new country left the UK in 1922.

Donal Lenihan recalled his dissatisfaction that the UK anthem "God Save the Queen" was played during the 1989 tour to Australia. Later Lions teams lacked any anthem.

== Introduction as official song ==
"The Power of Four" ("The Power") was commissioned by Clive Woodward for the 2005 British & Irish Lions tour to New Zealand; it was written by Neil Myers. The song was recorded by the Melody Music Lions Choir. It is a classical composition played in a high key.

Its first live performance was by Welsh singer Katherine Jenkins before the British & Irish Lions rugby union match against Argentina at the Millennium Stadium in Cardiff in 2005. It had been announced that a new anthem would be introduced at the match, but what the song was to be had been kept secret. Pre-match speculation included possibilities of: "God Save the Queen"; or the Welsh national anthem "Hen Wlad Fy Nhadau"; or a combination of anthems of the Home Nations – England (and Northern Ireland), Wales, and Scotland – and of the Republic of Ireland. "The Power" was always sung in English.

Before the Lions squad was selected, Woodward sent out bracelets with "The Power of Four" printed on them to potential British & Irish Lions players to try and create a sense of unity and to make them think about the upcoming tour to New Zealand. The phrase The Power of Four was also used as a motivational slogan in some of the Lions' team-building activities.

The lyrics of "The Power" were circulated to all of the members of the Lions tour squad and the song was pre-added to the playlists on their tour iPods. The song was not released as a single; however, it was permitted to be broadcast by radio stations and it was available for download. The players were shown the words of "The Power" on the Saturday before their first game and it was expected that they would know the words by the time they had arrived in New Zealand; a British & Irish Lions spokesman noted that the players were under no obligation to sing it, however.

== Reception ==
The BBC opined during the Lions' warm-up game against the Otago team that the song was not inspiring for the Lions supporters to sing. Austin Healey observed that the players did not appear to like "The Power" when it was performed.

Before the first Test match, it was noticed that despite Lions fans being filmed singing the new anthem, none of the players sang it when it was played before the All Blacks' "God Defend New Zealand". According to the New Zealand Herald's deputy editor, Lions fans felt that the anthem was not catching on and one even suggested that "Axel F" ("Crazy Frog" version) would be better than "The Power". The sports journalist Frank Keating, in criticising what he perceived as a selection bias towards English players of the Lions, said that "Land of Hope and Glory", a song associated with England and the England team, "might as well be the anthem" rather than what he called the "direful dirge". The Lions' acting captain, Martin Corry said that he did not attempt to sing the anthem because he felt that he would not be able to reach the correct notes. In 2009, Lions lock Alun Wyn Jones said that "I'd rather sing 'The Power of Love'", (Note: Reports do not say which specific song Jones may be referring to, and there are several with this title. See: The Power of Love (disambiguation) § Songs) when asked if he would want to sing "The Power of Four".

The song attracted a mixed response in the media. In July 2005, following the Lions tour, a journalist on the BBC Sport website, James Standley, commented that "The Power" is "hollow and disliked by fans", while Lions coach Clive Woodward had said he hoped it would "stir the passions". It was described in The Independent as an "excruciating mix of politburo and classical pop". However, Danny Stevens in The New Zealand Herald said that "The Power" was not a bad song but unfortunately nobody actually knew the tune or the words." The words of "The Power" were compared to the New Zealand Māori rugby union team's "Timatanga" haka in The Telegraph. Woodward and team manager, Bill Beaumont had "The Power" played whenever they entered into a press conference; this led one New Zealand Herald writer to suggest that a Lions' press conference could be "mistaken for a revivalist meeting".

The anthem did not return for the 2009 British & Irish Lions tour to South Africa, which received a positive reaction from Sky Sports reporters.

== Legacy ==
The negative reception of "The Power of Four" was listed as one of the criticisms of Woodward following the failures of the tour.

After 2005, "The Power" became largely forgotten. During the 2013 British & Irish Lions tour to Australia, ESPN jokingly suggested that "The Power" would be remixed into a hip hop song for the third test by Pharrell Williams and would be performed by Snoop Dogg.
