= Baby, I Love Your Way/Freebird Medley =

1988 song by Will to Power

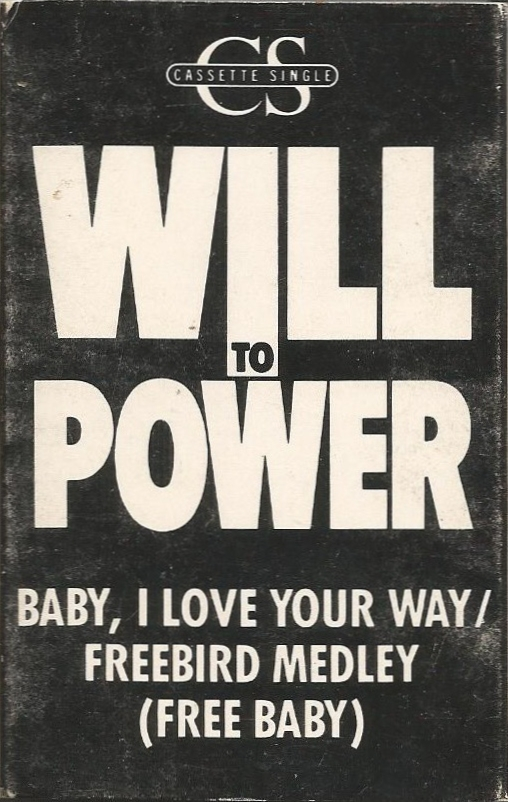
- US retail cassette single

Single by Will to Power

from the album Will to Power
- B-side: "Anti-Social"
- Released: August 1988
- Genre: Freestyle
- Length: 4:07
- Label: Epic
- Songwriters: Peter Frampton; Allen Collins; Ronnie Van Zant
- Producer: Bob Rosenberg

Will to Power singles chronology
| "Say It's Gonna Rain" (1988) | "Baby, I Love Your Way/Freebird Medley" (1988) | "Fading Away" (1989) |

Music video
- "Baby I Love Your Way/Freebird Medley" on YouTube

"Baby, I Love Your Way/Freebird Medley (Free Baby)" is a song by American dance-pop band Will to Power. The song combines elements of two previously recorded rock songs: "Baby, I Love Your Way", a number-12 Billboard Hot 100 hit from 1976 by English musician Peter Frampton, and "Free Bird" by American Southern rock band Lynyrd Skynyrd, which reached number 19 on the Hot 100 chart in 1975. Suzi Carr is the female vocalist and a producer for the song.

In the United States, the medley spent one week at number one on the Billboard Hot 100 and also peaked at number two on the Billboard Adult Contemporary chart. Internationally, the song topped the Canadian, Norwegian, and Portuguese charts and reached the top 20 in Australia, Ireland, New Zealand, the United Kingdom, and West Germany. In March and April 2009, VH1 ran a countdown of the "100 Greatest One Hit Wonders of the 80s", placing it at number 97 despite the group having another US top-10 hit in 1991 with a cover version of the 1975 10cc hit "I'm Not in Love".

== Track listings ==
7-inch and cassette single
| No. | Title | Length |
|---|---|---|
| 1. | "Baby, I Love Your Way/Freebird Medley (Free Baby)" | 4:07 |
| 2. | "Anti-Social" | 4:20 |

UK 12-inch and CD single
| No. | Title | Length |
|---|---|---|
| 1. | "Baby, I Love Your Way/Free Bird" | 4:07 |
| 2. | "Anti-Social" | 4:20 |
| 3. | "Dreamin'" (new mix) | 7:40 |

European 12-inch and mini maxi-single
| No. | Title | Length |
|---|---|---|
| 1. | "Baby, I Love Your Way/Free Bird" | 4:07 |
| 2. | "Anti-Social" | 4:20 |
| 3. | "Say It's Gonna Rain" | 3:53 |

== Charts ==
=== Weekly charts ===
| Chart (1988–1989) | Peak position |
|---|---|
| Australia (ARIA) | 20 |
| Belgium (Ultratop 50 Flanders) | 22 |
| Canada Retail Singles (The Record) | 1 |
| Canada Top Singles (RPM) | 1 |
| Europe (Eurochart Hot 100) | 23 |
| Ireland (IRMA) | 3 |
| Netherlands (Dutch Top 40) | 22 |
| Netherlands (Single Top 100) | 26 |
| New Zealand (Recorded Music NZ) | 6 |
| Norway (VG-lista) | 1 |
| Portugal (AFP) | 1 |
| UK Singles (Official Charts) | 6 |
| US Billboard Hot 100 | 1 |
| US Adult Contemporary (Billboard) | 2 |
| West Germany (GfK) | 18 |

=== Year-end charts ===
| Chart (1989) | Position |
|---|---|
| US Billboard Hot 100 | 9 |
| US Adult Contemporary (Billboard) | 30 |

== Certifications ==
| Region | Certification | Certified units/sales |
|---|---|---|
| United States (RIAA) | Gold | 500,000^{^} |
^{^} Shipments figures based on certification alone.

== See also ==
- List of Billboard Hot 100 number-one singles of 1988
