= You're Not Alone (Olive song) =

1996 single by Olive

- Artwork for UK CD2 (1997)

Single by Olive

from the album Extra Virgin
- Released: 19 August 1996
- Genre: Piano rock
- Length: 4:30 (album version); 3:45 (1996 radio edit); 4:08 (1997 radio edit)
- Label: RCA; BMG
- Songwriters: Ruth-Ann Boyle; Tim Kellett; Robin Taylor-Firth
- Producers: Ruth-Ann Boyle; Tim Kellett; Robin Taylor-Firth

Olive singles chronology
"Miracle" (1996)	"You're Not Alone" (1996)	"Outlaw" (1997)

Music video
- "You're Not Alone" on YouTube

"You're Not Alone" is a song written by Tim Kellett and Robin Taylor-Firth and performed by British trip hop group Olive. Released as a single from their debut album, Extra Virgin (1996), in August 1996, it found greater success in 1997 in a remixed version, reaching number one on the UK Singles Chart that May. It also became a top-10 hit in six additional countries and won one of the Ivor Novello Awards in the category of Best Dance Music. Three different music videos were filmed for "You're Not Alone". The song has been covered by a number of artists, most notably by German trance DJ and producer ATB in 2002 and Danish singer-songwriter Mads Langer in 2009.

== Critical reception ==
Barry Walters for The Advocate remarked that the song "in its original rendition resembles recent Everything But the Girl and now comes across as every other perfect pop-turned-disco masterpiece." Larry Flick from Billboard magazine described "You're Not Alone" as a "lush, ambient tune that has the dark and torchy texture of Everything But the Girl, but with a far more mainstream-friendly, classic-soul flavor." He complimented singer Ruth-Ann Boyle who "brings a rich, smoky quality to the song, while musicians Robin Taylor-Firth and Tim Kellett underline her performance with sweet, swirling strings and jittery breakbeatstyled percussion." Scottish Daily Record called it a "hypnotic dance chart-topper", noting that features former Simply Red "keyboard wiz" Kellett. Caroline Sullivan from The Guardian felt "the single's summery lilt was balanced by a majestic keyboard riff". Jennifer Nine from Melody Maker wrote, "A Nightmares On Wax guy, a Simply Red sideman and a girl with no last name (of course) have accomplished, quite handily, what they evidently set out to do. A shuffly and vulnerable downbeat, vaguely melancholy—if somewhat fatally unmysterious—Top Shop version of the Massive-Nicolette-Everything But the Girl-you know who end of things."

A reviewer from Music Week gave the 1996 version four out of five, saying, "Weirded-out production and a good tune, this provides the perfect preview of an excellent album." In 1997, they rated the remix three out of five, describing it as a "sparkling pop groove [that] ought to do the chart business and already has strong club support thanks to remixes from the likes of Oakenfold and Roni Size." Jeremy Helligar from People magazine wrote, "Its soothing lyrics are punctuated by rumblings of tense, stuttering drum and bass, hinting at some darker obsession." Ian Hyland from Sunday Mirror gave it eight out of ten, commenting, "No, not the greasy woman out of 'On The Buses' but a top dance groove techno type group who sound a bit European but have turned up this pearler of a club monster all the same. Remixes galore make it hard to ignore but if you are a Friday nighter, you'will have heard it already." David Sinclair from The Times noted that "strangely out-of-phase dance production gives this haunting tune a distinctive edge."

== Music video ==
Three entirely different music videos were filmed for "You're Not Alone". The first video features all three band members Ruth-Ann Boyle, Tim Kellett and Robin Taylor-Firth appearing in spectral forms in a hotel room. The second video was for the new remixed Radio Edit of the track which became the most commercially successful. Featuring all three band members, it was filmed in France including scenes in a public toilet, and by a road with glowing headlights of cars. A third video by director Timothy White was filmed for the US, featuring band members Boyle and Kellett in moody urban settings.

== Impact and legacy ==
In 2017, Billboard ranked "You're Not Alone" number 64 in their list of "The 100 Greatest Pop Songs of 1997", praising it as "one of the year's most striking pop singles, with club energy and trip-hop atmospherics, based around Olive's soulful siren call and synths that streak across the production like an electrical storm." Same year, BuzzFeed ranked it among "The 101 Greatest Dance Songs of the '90s". In 2018, Mixmag ranked it among "The 15 Best Mid-90s Trance Tracks", naming it "a track of life-affirming proportions" and "a defining slice of trance." Mixmag editor James Ball added, "Olive's vocals offer a comfort blanket to weary ravers in between sharp synth stabs and floaty breaks." In 2020, RedBull.com ranked it number one in their list of "10 Underrated Dance Songs from the 1990s That Still Sound Amazing". In 2022, Classic Pop ranked it number 20 in their list of the top 40 dance tracks of the 90's, praising it as "a monumental dream-house smash hit and one of the most gorgeous melodies to sweeten the UK charts during the era."

== Awards ==
Year	Nominated work	Award	Category	Result
1997	"You're Not Alone"	Ivor Novello Awards	Best Dance Music	Won

== Track listings ==
UK 1996 CD single
No.	Title	Length
1.	"You're Not Alone" (radio edit)
2.	"You're Not Alone" (Roni Size remix)
3.	"You're Not Alone" (X-Press 2's Vocal Voyage edit)
4.	"You're Not Alone" (Tin Tin Out remix)
5.	"You're Not Alone" (Nightmares on Wax remix)
6.	"You're Not Alone" (Black Olive's End of Time remix)

UK re-release CD1
No.	Title	Length
1.	"You're Not Alone" (radio edit)	4:15
2.	"You're Not Alone" (Oakenfold/Osborne)	10:09
3.	"You're Not Alone" (Black Olive's extended mix)	6:19
4.	"You're Not Alone" (Roni Size remix)	5:57
5.	"You're Not Alone" (Nightmares on Wax remix)	6:36
6.	"You're Not Alone" (Black Olive's End of Time remix)	6:39

UK re-release CD2
No.	Title	Length
1.	"You're Not Alone" (radio edit)	4:18
2.	"You're Not Alone" (Black Olive's extended mix)	6:20
3.	"You're Not Alone" (Rollo and Sister Bliss Remix)	8:31
4.	"You're Not Alone" (Matthew Roberts' Cloud 10 mix)	7:32
5.	"You're Not Alone" (Matthew Roberts' Phunk Phorce mix)	6:39
6.	"You're Not Alone" (Ganja Kru remix)	5:45

US maxi-CD single
No.	Title	Length
1.	"You're Not Alone" (radio edit)	4:31
2.	"You're Not Alone" (Oakenfold/Osborne 12-inch mix)	10:06
3.	"You're Not Alone" (Rollo and Sister Bliss 12-inch mix)	8:27
4.	"You're Not Alone" (Matthew Roberts' Cloud 10 Mix)	7:29
5.	"You're Not Alone" (Ganja Kru Remix)	3:43

== Charts ==
=== Weekly charts ===
Chart (1997)	Peak position
Australia (ARIA)	40
Belgium (Ultratop 50 Flanders)	13
Belgium (Ultratop 50 Wallonia)	29
Canada (Nielsen SoundScan)	17
Canada Dance/Urban (RPM)	10
Denmark (Tracklisten)	4
Europe (Eurochart Hot 100)	7
Finland (Suomen virallinen lista)	9
France (SNEP)	42
Germany (GfK)	26
Iceland (Íslenski Listinn Topp 40)	4
Ireland (IRMA)	3
Israel (Israeli Singles Chart)	5
Italy (Musica e dischi)	18
Italy Airplay (Music & Media)	5
Netherlands (Dutch Top 40)	24
Netherlands (Single Top 100)	24
Scottish Singles Sales (Official Charts)	1
Spain (AFYVE)	6
Sweden (Sverigetopplistan)	14
Switzerland (Schweizer Hitparade)	16
UK Singles (Official Charts)	1
US Billboard Hot 100	56
US Dance Club Play (Billboard)	5
US Maxi-Singles Sales (Billboard)	9

=== Year-end charts ===
Chart (1997)	Position
Belgium (Ultratop 50 Flanders)	86
Europe (Eurochart Hot 100)	81
Iceland (Íslenski Listinn Topp 40)	53
Romania (Romanian Top 100)	61
UK Singles (OCC)	37
UK Club Chart (Music Week)	3
US Maxi-Singles Sales (Billboard)	36

== Certifications ==
Region	Certification	Certified units/sales
United Kingdom (BPI)	Platinum	600,000^{‡}
^{‡} Sales+streaming figures based on certification alone.

== Release history ==
Region	Date	Format(s)	Label(s)	Ref.
United Kingdom	19 August 1996	12-inch vinyl; CD; cassette	RCA; BMG	
United Kingdom (re-release)	5 May 1997	CD; cassette	RCA; BMG	
United States	21 July 1997	Modern rock radio	RCA	

== ATB version ==
"You're Not Alone"

Single by ATB

from the album Dedicated
- Released: 15 April 2002
- Genre: Trance
- Length: 3:27
- Label: Kontor
- Songwriters: Tim Kellett; Robin Taylor-Firth
- Producer: André Tanneberger

ATB singles chronology
"Hold You" (2001)	"You're Not Alone" (2002)	"I Don't Wanna Stop" (2003)

German trance producer and disc jockey ATB covered the song and released it as a single on 15 April 2002 in Germany. The US CD release by Radikal Records had a cover misprint indicating the identical 4 track list as the 12-inch record release, however the CD contained 5 tracks.

=== Track listings ===
US 12-inch release
No.	Title	Length
1.	"You're Not Alone" (Clubb Mix 2)	7:25
2.	"You're Not Alone" (Airplay Chill Mix)	3:13
3.	"You're Not Alone" (Clubb Mix 1)	5:57
4.	"Rising Moon" (Rising Mix)	3:13

German 12-inch release
No.	Title	Length
1.	"You're Not Alone" (1st Clubb Mix)	6:23
2.	"You're Not Alone" (2nd Clubb Mix)	7:23

US Maxi single
No.	Title	Length
1.	"You're Not Alone" (Airplay Mix)	3:29
2.	"You're Not Alone" (Airplay Chill Mix)	3:13
3.	"Rising Moon" (Rising Mix)	3:13
4.	"You're Not Alone" (Clubb Mix 1)	5:57
5.	"You're Not Alone" (Clubb Mix 2)	7:25

German CD single
No.	Title	Length
1.	"You're Not Alone" (Airplay Mix)	3:27
2.	"You're Not Alone" (Airplay Chill Mix)	3:11
3.	"Rising Moon" (Rising Mix)	3:12
4.	"You're Not Alone" (2nd Clubb Mix)	7:21

Netherlands CD1
No.	Title	Length
1.	"You're Not Alone" (Airplay Mix)	3:27
2.	"You're Not Alone" (Airplay Chill Mix)	3:11
3.	"Rising Moon" (Rising Mix)	3:12
4.	"You're Not Alone" (2nd Clubb Mix)	7:21

Netherlands CD2
No.	Title	Length
1.	"You're Not Alone" (Airplay Mix)	3:27
2.	"You're Not Alone" (Airplay Chill Mix)	3:11

Australia CD single
No.	Title	Length
1.	"You're Not Alone" (Radio Edit)
2.	"You're Not Alone" (1st Club Mix)
3.	"You're Not Alone" (2nd Club Mix)
4.	"Hold You" (Airplay Mix)
5.	"Hold You" (Svenson & Gielen Mix)
6.	"The Fields of Love" (Public Domain Mix)
7.	"Killer" (Lost Witness Mix)
8.	"9pm" (Bent Mix)

=== Personnel ===
- Songwriting – Tim Kellett, Robin Taylor-Firth
- Lyrics – Tim Kellett
- Production, arrangement, engineering – André Tanneberger
- Vocals – Roberta Carter Harrison

=== Charts ===
Chart (2002)	Peak position
Austria (Ö3 Austria Top 40)	17
Belgium (Ultratip Bubbling Under Flanders)	14
Czech Republic (IFPI)	26
Germany (GfK)	13
Hungary (Rádiós Top 40)	6
Hungary (Single Top 40)	9
Netherlands (Single Top 100)	82
Romania (Romanian Top 100)	6
Switzerland (Schweizer Hitparade)	80

Chart (2024)	Peak position
Poland (Polish Airplay Top 100)	69

== Mads Langer version ==
"You're Not Alone"

Single by Mads Langer
- Released: 14 December 2009
- Studio: Medley (Copenhagen, Denmark)
- Genre: Pop rock
- Length: 3:06
- Label: Copenhagen
- Songwriters: Tim Kellett; Robin Taylor-Firth
- Producers: Søren Mikkelsen; Mads Langer

Alternative cover
- German CD single

Danish singer-songwriter Mads Langer released a cover version of the song on 14 December 2009. The song charted in Belgium, Denmark, Italy, and the Netherlands. The cover version was later included on Langer's first international studio album, Behold which was released on 9 May 2011.

=== Track listings ===
Digital download
No.	Title	Length
1.	"You're Not Alone"	3:06

Italian CD single
No.	Title	Length
1.	"You're Not Alone" (original)
2.	"You're Not Alone" (Da Brozz Edit Remix)
3.	"You're Not Alone" (Mark & Shark Radio Mix)
4.	"You're Not Alone" (DJ Brizi Latin Radio Mix)
5.	"You're Not Alone" (Da Brozz Remix)
6.	"You're Not Alone" (Mark & Shark Extended Mix)
7.	"You're Not Alone" (DJ Brizi Latin Extended Remix)

German CD single
No.	Title	Length
1.	"You're Not Alone"	3:07
2.	"You're Not Alone" (instrumental version)	3:11

=== Personnel ===
- Songwriting – Tim Kellett, Robin Taylor-Firth
- Production, mastering and acoustic guitar – Søren Mikkelsen
- Co-production, instruments and vocals – Mads Langer

=== Weekly charts ===
Chart (2009–2011)	Peak position
Belgium (Ultratip Bubbling Under Flanders)	29
Belgium (Ultratip Bubbling Under Wallonia)	20
Denmark (Tracklisten)	17
Germany (GfK)	43
German Airplay Chart	18
Italy (FIMI)	6
Italy Airplay (EarOne)	1
Netherlands (Single Top 100)	52

=== Year-end charts ===
Chart (2010)	Position
Italy Airplay (EarOne)	5

=== Certifications ===
Certifications for "You're Not Alone"
Region	Certification	Certified units/sales
Denmark (IFPI Danmark)	Gold	15,000^{^}
Italy (FIMI)	Platinum	30,000^{*}
^{*} Sales figures based on certification alone.^{^} Shipments figures based on certification alone.

== Other versions ==
- In 2009 the song was sampled by British rapper Tinchy Stryder on the song "You're Not Alone". It was released as a single from his second studio album, Catch 22 on 26 October 2009.
- In 2017, a version by Scotty Boy and Lizzie Curious went to number one on the US Dance Club Songs chart.
- A singer under the name Astræa (Jennifer Ann) released a version for the 2018 Lloyds TV advert.
- In 2020, progressive rock band Esoterica released a cover of the song on their fourth studio album, In Dreams.

== See also ==
- List of number-one dance singles of 2017 (U.S.)
