= Curtain Call at Cactus Creek =

1950 film by Charles Lamont

- Film poster
- Directed by: Charles Lamont
- Screenplay by: Howard Dimsdale
- Story by: Howard Dimsdale; Stanley Roberts
- Produced by: Robert Arthur
- Starring: Donald O'Connor; Gale Storm; Vincent Price; Eve Arden
- Cinematography: Russell Metty
- Edited by: Frank Gross
- Music by: Walter Scharf
- Color process: Technicolor
- Production company: Universal Pictures
- Distributed by: Universal Pictures
- Release dates: January 1950 (Australia); January 25, 1950 (Fayette, Iowa); September 21, 1950 (New York)
- Running time: 86 minutes
- Country: United States
- Language: English
- Budget: $620,000-$850,000 (est).

Curtain Call at Cactus Creek is a 1950 American Technicolor Western comedy film starring Donald O'Connor and Gale Storm. The plot concerns a traveling entertainer (O'Connor) who becomes involved with bank robbers.

== Plot ==
A traveling troupe of entertainers arrives in Cactus Creek, Arizona to perform. The act's stars are singer Lily Martin, her niece Julie and the flamboyant actor Tracy Holland, while Eddie Timmons, who is in love with Julie, handles the lighting, sound effects and other duties, although his ambition is to perform on stage.

The bandit Rimrock Thomas arrives with his gang to rob a bank. While watching Lily perform, Rimrock concocts a plan to time the robbery to coincide with the next show. When an explosion is heard from the direction of the bank, the audience and entertainers flee.

Rimrock hides in Eddie's wagon and keeps the show as a front, teaching Eddie how to become a successful outlaw. After Eddie is caught by a sheriff, Rimrock helps him escape from jail. When he is cornered, Rimrock arranges it so that it appears that Eddie had captured him. Eddie collects a $26,000 reward and vows to abandon crime, but Rimrock expects to see him again soon.

== Cast ==
- Donald O'Connor as Edward Timmons
- Gale Storm as Julie Martin
- Walter Brennan as Rimrock Thomas
- Vincent Price as Tracy Holland
- Eve Arden as Lily Martin
- Chick Chandler as Ralph
- Joe Sawyer as Jake
- Harry Shannon as U.S. Marshal Clay
- Rex Lease as Yellowstone
- I. Stanford Jolley as Pecos

== Release ==
Before the film's American premiere, Curtain Call at Cactus Creek opened in Australia in early January 1950. The film was also screened in a limited engagement in Fayette, Iowa at the end of January in advance of a general release in June.

== Reception ==
In a contemporary review for The New York Times, critic Bosley Crowther wrote: "The comical misadventures of a stagehand with a one-horse theatre troupe that is traveling the Western frontier circuit back in the blood-and-thunder days are recounted with moderate good humor, but no marked originality ... However, those who have a fondness for Donald O'Connor, if such there be, may find it more amusing than others, for there is plenty of Mr. O'Connor in this film. ... The best to be said for this picture is that it has a few bright burlesque spots, is in color and comes to a finish in a reasonable length of time."
