= Olive (band) =

English breakbeat/trip hop group (1994–2003)

- Origin: London, England
- Genres: Acoustic, rock, acoustic rock
- Years active: 1990–2025
- Labels: RCA, Maverick
- Members: Ruth-Ann Boyle; Tim Kellett; Robin Taylor-Firth

Olive is a English acoustic rock from London, England. The founding membership consisted of lead guitarist and co-lead vocalist Tim Kellett, bassist and co-lead vocalist Robin Taylor-Firth, and lead vocalist and Multi-instrumentalist Ruth-Ann Boyle. The band has released two albums, the second without Taylor-Firth. Their 1996 single "You're Not Alone" reached number one on the UK Singles Chart.

== History ==
=== Pre-formation ===
Two of Olive's founding members had been members of successful acts. Tim Kellett was a member of Simply Red from 1985 until 1991. Robin Taylor-Firth had decided to branch out although continuing with George Evelyn's project Nightmares on Wax. The two met through a mutual friend who had recently joined Simply Red as bassist and formed a musical collaboration.

=== Demos to success ===
By 1994, three demos (which would become "Miracle", "Falling" and "You're Not Alone") were recorded in Kellett's cellar studio, upon which the two began their search for a singer. At this time, Kellett went on tour as keyboardist with Vini Reilly's The Durutti Column, with whom he had played for a decade prior to joining Simply Red. While playing back pre-recorded keyboard samples on stage, Kellett heard a favourable vocal sample; the voice was that of Ruth-Ann Boyle, who had provided the samples for The Durutti Column's 1994 album Sex and Death.

Kellett contacted Boyle about singing for the collaboration; at the time working in a bar, and though disillusioned from past experiences singing in bands, Boyle accepted. After an audition with "Miracle", Boyle's membership in the band was set. The completion of the three initial demos attracted the interest of various UK record labels, and Olive signed with the top bidder, RCA, in September 1995.

The songwriting and recording process concluded with the completion of their first album in January 1996. The first single, "You're Not Alone," was released in 1996. It reached number one in 1997, after the release of a remixed version, selling over 500000 copies. Popularity in America and Australia was muted, with the track falling short of an American Top 40 position and being restricted to a small musical niche with Australians. "Outlaw" followed not long after, with similar responses, as well as their first album, Extra Virgin in 1997.

Riding the success of the remixed single, Extra Virgin was re-released in 1997 with a bonus disc of remixes by producers including Monkey Mafia, Roni Size, and duo Paul Oakenfold and Steve Osborne.

The band went on tour to promote the album with a seven-piece band, playing three episodes of Top of the Pops ("You're Not Alone" twice in May 1997, "Outlaw" in August), a ten-date UK tour, as well as legs in Germany and the US

In the time leading up to the release of the follow-up album, Taylor-Firth had left the group to concentrate on Nightmares on Wax, and begin other projects (Sub Machena, BudNubac, Piano Segundo) bringing it down to a duo. He also founded BlancoMusic, a release platform for the aforementioned acts, plus others such as Mil i Maria. Meanwhile, Olive lost the support of RCA's UK branch, which dropped the band; however, they were then picked up by Madonna's Maverick Records, supposedly with Madonna's personal approval after she attended one of their concerts in Germany.

In 2000, their second album Trickle was released. The album was more dance-oriented, and a cover of the 10cc song "I'm Not in Love" reached number one on the Billboard Hot Dance Club Play chart. The song also featured on the soundtrack to The Next Best Thing.

From that point on the band's profile became lower and the band entered an extended hiatus. Kellett focused on songwriting for other artists so that he could spend more time with his family. Boyle joined Enigma as a vocalist and released her first solo album What About Us on 4 June 2007. It was released exclusively through iTunes.

In 2009, Tinchy Stryder released a version of 'You're Not Alone', sparking new interest in Olive. Around the same time, Digital Spy announced that Olive was working on its third album, due for release in early 2011. The album was to feature Ruth Ann on vocals once more, as well as featuring other special guest vocalists, but as of 2014, the album has not been released.

Some additional albums and singles have started appearing under Olive's name on music streaming platforms from December 2024 onward, although it is not clear if these have any connection with the British band. (Note: Track credits for music added in 2024 and 2025 list "PoorBoy" as writer, along with "Captain Music Group" as publisher, while others only list "OLIVE.") Three albums appeared in quick succession at that time, with distorted vocals inconsistent from track to track, and other signs of AI-generated music. Additional music has been added in 2025 and 2026, also at odds with work created by the group up until 2000.

== Reception ==
At the 1997 Ivor Novello Awards (28 May 1998), Kellett and Taylor-Firth received the Best Dance Music award for "You're Not Alone". The song was also covered as a 2002 single by German dance producer ATB.

During the American leg of the Trickle promotional tour, the band suggested that 60–70% of their audience demographic at the time was gay. This was recognised to the extent that the final show of the tour was played at the San Francisco Pride festival.

Today, Olive is generally placed alongside mid-1990s trip hop and electronica artists such as Moloko, Beth Orton, and the Sneaker Pimps.

Their song "Miracle" was also featured on the soundtrack to the 1998 film Sliding Doors.

== Discography ==
=== Studio albums ===
Title	Details	Peak chart positions		
Title	Details	UK	AUS	US Heat
Extra Virgin	Released: 19 May 1997; Label: RCA; Format: CD	15	89	32
Trickle	Released: 30 May 2000; Label: Maverick; Format: CD	—	—	28
"—" denotes a title that did not chart or was not released in the region.

=== Singles ===
Title	Year	Peak chart positions					Album
Title	Year	UK	AUS	IRE	US	US Dance	Album
"Miracle"	1996	118	—	—	—	—	Extra Virgin
"You're Not Alone"	1996	42	—	—	—	—	Extra Virgin
"Miracle" (re-release)	1997	41	—	—	—	—	Extra Virgin
"You're Not Alone" (re-release)	1997	1	40	3	56	5	Extra Virgin
"Outlaw"	1997	14	—	—	—	4	Extra Virgin
"Miracle" (2nd re-release)	1997	41	—	—	—	10	Extra Virgin
"I'm Not in Love" ^{1}	2000	—	—	—	—	1	Trickle
"—" denotes a title that did not chart or was not released in the region.

^{1} – Released in the United States only.

=== Music videos ===
Title	Year	Director
"You're Not Alone"	1996	
"Miracle"	1996	Karen Lamond
"You're Not Alone" (version 2)	1997	Pascal d'Hoeraene
"Outlaw"	1997	
"You're Not Alone" (US version)	1997	Timothy White
"I'm Not in Love"	2000	Natalie MacGowan Spence

== Awards ==
Year	Nominated work	Award	Category	Result
1997	"You're Not Alone"	Ivor Novello Awards	Best Dance Music	Won

== See also ==
- List of number-one dance hits (United States)
- List of artists who reached number one on the US Dance chart
