= Dreamin' (Will to Power song) =

Single by Will to Power

from the album Will to Power
- Released: 1987
- Recorded: 1987
- Genre: Freestyle
- Length: 4:12 (album version); 7:43 (extended version)
- Label: Epic
- Songwriter(s): Bob Rosenberg
- Producer(s): Bob Rosenberg

Will to Power singles chronology
"Dreamin'" (1987)	"Say It's Gonna Rain" (1988)

"Dreamin'" is the debut single by the American dance-pop band Will to Power, released in 1987 off their self-titled debut album. The dance song reached No. 50 on the Billboard Hot 100 and No. 15 on the dance chart in the United States. Many different versions were recorded, including an extended version and a "Manhattan Mix".

Background vocals are performed by two of the original members of Expose’, Alejandra (Ale’) Lorenzo and Laurie Miller.

== Track listings ==
US 12" single

No.	Title	Length
1.	"Dreamin'" (Manhattan Mix)	7:20
2.	"Dreamin'" (Instrumental)	4:08
3.	"Dreamin'" (New Mix)	7:40
4.	"Dreamin'" (Dub)	3:45

== Charts ==
Chart	Peak position
US Billboard Hot 100	50
US Hot Dance Music/Club Play	15
US Hot Black Singles	40
