= Cruise director =

Senior officer on a cruise ship

A cruise director is a high-ranking or senior officer of a cruise ship with responsibility for all onboard hospitality, entertainment and social events, who acts as the public face of the company. The cruise director reports to the hotel director, has a deputy or assistant cruise director, and is supported by a team of entertainment staff.

Responsibilities of a cruise director may include:

- Scheduling of entertainment, activities and social events
- Officer in charge of entertainment staff
- Public announcements
- Conducting and supervising safety briefings or drills for both passengers and crew.

== Portrayals on television ==
As a highly visible member of staff on a cruise ship, many television actors have portrayed the role of a cruise director. Notable examples are Lauren Tewes as Julie McCoy in The Love Boat and Gale Storm as Susanna Pomeroy in The Gale Storm Show.
