= The Power of Love =

The Power of Love or Power of Love may refer to:

== Film and television ==
- The Power of Love (film), an early 3D film demonstrated in 1922
- "The Power of Love", an episode of The O.C. (2005)
- "The Power of Love", an episode of Degrassi: The Next Generation (2004)

== Music ==
=== Albums ===
- The Power of Love (Fish Leong album), 2003
- The Power of Love (Sam Bailey album), 2014
- Power of Love (Hour Glass album), 1967
- Power of Love (Luther Vandross album), 1991
- Harry and the Potters and the Power of Love, 2006
- Power of Love, by Arlo Guthrie, 1981
- The Power of Love (Captain Sensible album), 1983

=== Songs ===
- "(You Got) The Power of Love", by The Everly Brothers (1966)
- "The Power of Love" (Charley Pride song) (1984)
- "The Power of Love" (Jennifer Rush song) (1984), and notably covered by Air Supply (1985), Laura Branigan (1987), and Celine Dion (1993)
- "The Power of Love" (Frankie Goes to Hollywood song) (1984)
- "The Power of Love" (Huey Lewis and the News song) (1985)
- "Power of Love" (Deee-Lite song) (1990)
- "Power of Love", by Judy and Mary (1993)
- "The Power of Love", a composition by Percy Grainger
- "Power of Love/Love Power", by Luther Vandross
- "The Power of Love", by 10cc from Ten Out of 10
- "The Power of Love", by Corona
- "The Power of Love", by Ray Conniff
- "Power of Love" (Joe Simon song) (1972)
- "Power of Love", by Mahavishnu Orchestra, the opening track from their album Apocalypse
- "Power of Love", by Gary Wright, from the album The Dream Weaver
- "The Power of Love", from Sailor Moon & The Scouts - Lunarock soundtrack
- "Power of Love", by Seventeen, from the single album Power of Love (2021)

=== Concerts ===
- Power of Love, a Seventeen concert

== See also ==
- Love Power (disambiguation)
