= Ruth-Ann Boyle =

British singer (born 1970)

- Born: 26 April 1970 (age 56)
- Origin: Sunderland, England
- Genre: Acoustic rock
- Occupations: Multi-instrumentalist; singer; songwriter; record producer
- Instrument: Vocals
- Years active: 1987–present
- Formerly of: Olive; Enigma

Ruth-Ann Boyle (born 26 April 1970) is an English singer. Together with producers Tim Kellett and Robin Taylor-Firth, she formed the British band Olive. The band's single "You're Not Alone" reached number 1 in the UK Singles Chart on its second release in 1997.

In 1999 she sang lead vocals on tracks "Gravity of Love" and "Silence Must Be Heard" on Enigma's album The Screen Behind the Mirror, the former of which was also released as a single. She also performed guest-vocals for their 2003 album Voyageur.

Her first solo album What About Us?, produced by Michael Cretu of Enigma, was only released as a digital download via iTunes in 2007, quoting a lack of necessary project support and co-ordination to produce physical copies of the album.

== Biography ==
Influenced by singers like Rickie Lee Jones and Joni Mitchell, Boyle joined various bands from age 17–19, but these turned out to be unpleasant experiences ("folk bands, Rickie Lee Jones and stuff like that, all the angst"). In the intervening time, she performed assembly-line work in factories before ending up managing a pub in Sheffield. Meanwhile, she also recorded vocal samples for The Durutti Column, the Manchester-based musical project headed by Vini Reilly.

However, Boyle was considering a career in nursing by the time Kellett, who had heard the vocal samples pre-recorded onto a keyboard while playing live with The Durutti Column, contacted her about singing for the group he had formed with Taylor-Firth. After auditioning, Boyle found in the band an ideal musical collaboration. Olive produced two albums from its inception in 1995 to 2000, after which the band ceased to work together.

During the production of Olive's second album under Madonna's label Maverick and titled as Trickle, Boyle met Michael Cretu, mastermind behind the 1990s leading new age/pop project of Enigma, who had heard one of her songs (Miracle) in Ibiza and he invited her to participate on his fourth concept album The Screen Behind the Mirror (1999). Boyle sang the lead vocals on two tracks on the album, one of them was released as the lead single titled "Gravity of Love" and afterward Boyle also performed as a female voice for the more commercial pop oriented Voyageur album on tracks "Boum-boum" and "Following the Sun" in late 2003.

Because of their successful collaboration, they produced a solo debut album, which was then produced in A.R.T. Studios in Ibiza, late 2004. The album was named What about Us? After numerous delays, the album was digitally released in June 2007.

== Discography ==
=== Albums ===
==== With Olive ====
- Extra Virgin (1997)
- Trickle (2000)

==== Solo ====
- What About Us? (2007; digital release only)

=== Collaborations ===
==== The Durutti Column ====
- Sex and Death (1994)
  - "The Rest of My Life"
  - "Believe in Me"
  - "Where I Should Be"

==== Grand Theft Audio ====
- Hold Back the Night (1999)
  - "Sleep Tonight"
  - "To Be with You" / "Mind and Body" (with Sara Jay)

==== Enigma ====
- The Screen Behind the Mirror (1999)
  - "Gravity of Love"
  - "Silence Must Be Heard"
- Voyageur (2003)
  - "Boum-boum" (with Andru Donalds)
  - "Following the Sun"
- Seven Lives Many Faces (2008)
  - "Touchness"
  - "Fata Morgana"
  - "We Are Nature"

==== Kojak ====
- Every Room on Every Floor (2003)
  - "Tell Me" (as Olive)
  - "You Can't Live Without Me" (as herself)
