= Love Power =

Love Power may refer to:

- "Love Power" (Dionne Warwick song), 1987
- "Love Power" (Will to Power album), 1996
- "Love Power" (Praga Khan song), 2003
- "Love Power" (The Boss song), 2011
- "Love Power" (The KMG's song), Belgian entry in the 2007 Eurovision Song Contest
- "Love Power" (Disenchanted song), 2022
- "Love Power", a 1967 song by The Sandpebbles (R&B group)
- "Love Power", a song by Ziggy Marley and the Melody Makers for the Muppet Treasure Island soundtrack
- "Love Power", a song from the 1968 film The Producers
- "Love Power", a 1975 song recorded by Motown singer, songwriter and producer Willie Hutch
- "Love Power", a song by Aice^{5} from the album Love Aice^{5}

== See also ==
- "Power of Love/Love Power", a 1991 song by Luther Vandross
