= Gale Storm =

American actress and singer (1922–2009)

- Storm in 1957
- Born: Josephine Owaissa Cottle; April 5, 1922; Bloomington, Texas, U.S.
- Died: June 27, 2009 (aged 87); Danville, California, U.S.
- Occupations: Actress, singer
- Years active: 1940–1989
- Known for: My Little Margie; The Gale Storm Show
- Labels: Dot; London
- Spouses: Lee Bonnell (m. 1941; died 1986) Paul Masterson (m. 1988; died 1996)
- Children: 4
- Awards: Hollywood Walk of Fame
- Website: galestorm.tv

Josephine Owaissa Cottle (April 5, 1922 – June 27, 2009), known professionally as Gale Storm, was an American actress and singer. After a film career from 1940 to 1952, she starred in two popular television programs of the 1950s, My Little Margie and The Gale Storm Show. Six of her songs were top ten hits. Storm's greatest recording success was a cover version of "I Hear You Knockin'," which hit No. 2 on the Billboard Hot 100 chart in 1955.

== Early life ==
Storm was born in Bloomington, Texas, United States. Her middle name Owaissa means "Bluebird" in a Native American language (Algonquian, such as Ojibwe/Chippewa). The youngest of five children, she had two brothers and two sisters. Her father, William Walter Cottle, died after a year-long illness when she was only 17 months old, and her mother, Minnie Corina Cottle, struggled to raise the children alone.

Storm attended Holy Rosary School in what is now Midtown, Houston. She performed in the drama club at both Albert Sidney Johnston Junior High School and San Jacinto High School.

When Storm was 17, two of her teachers urged her to enter a contest on Gateway to Hollywood, broadcast from the CBS Radio studios in Hollywood. First prize was a one-year contract with a movie studio, which she won, and was immediately given the stage name Gale Storm. Her performing partner (and future husband), Lee Bonnell from South Bend, Indiana, became known as Terry Belmont.

== Career ==
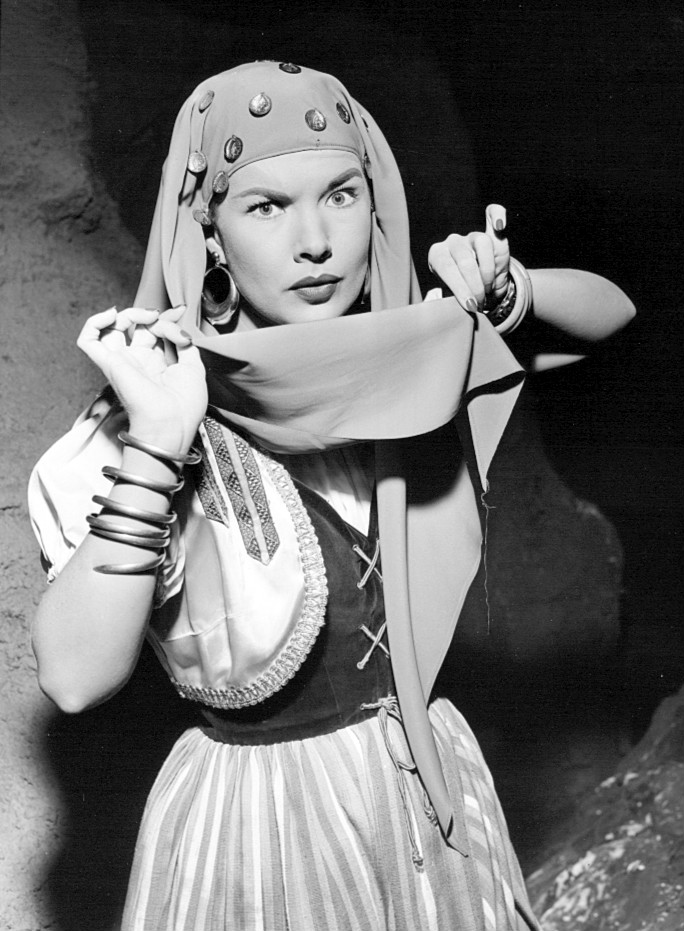
Storm in My Little Margie in 1953

Storm had a role in the radio version of Big Town. After winning the contest in 1940, Storm made several films for the RKO Radio Pictures studio. Her first was Tom Brown's School Days, playing opposite Jimmy Lydon and Freddie Bartholomew. She worked steadily in low-budget films released during this period. In 1941, she sang in several soundies, three-minute musicals produced for "movie jukeboxes".

She acted and sang in Monogram Pictures' Frankie Darro series, and played ingénue roles in other Monogram features with the East Side Kids, Edgar Kennedy, and the Three Stooges, most notably in the film Swing Parade of 1946. Monogram had always relied on established actors with reputations, but in Gale Storm, the studio finally had a star of its own. She played the lead in the studio's most elaborate productions, both musical and dramatic. She shared top billing in Monogram's The Crime Smasher (1943), opposite Edgar Kennedy, Richard Cromwell, and Frank Graham in the role of Jones, a character derived from network radio.

Storm starred in a number of films, including the romantic comedies G.I. Honeymoon (1945) and It Happened on Fifth Avenue (1947), the Western Stampede (1949), and the 1950 film-noir dramas The Underworld Story and Between Midnight and Dawn. U.S. audiences warmed to Storm and her fan mail increased. She performed in more than three dozen motion pictures for Monogram, experience which made possible her success in other media.

In 1950, Storm made her television debut in Hollywood Premiere Theatre on ABC. She also made singing appearances on such television variety programs as The Pat Boone Chevy Showroom.

From 1952 to 1955, she starred in My Little Margie, with former silent film actor Charles Farrell as her father. The series began as a summer replacement for I Love Lucy on CBS Television, but ran for 126 episodes on NBC and then CBS. The series was broadcast on CBS Radio from December 1952 to August 1955 with the same actors. Her popularity was capitalized on when she served as hostess of the NBC Comedy Hour in the winter of 1956.

In 1956, Storm starred in a situation comedy, The Gale Storm Show (Oh! Susanna), featuring another silent movie star, ZaSu Pitts. The show ran for 143 episodes on CBS and ABC between 1956 and 1960. Storm appeared regularly on other television programs in the 1950s and 1960s. In 1957 she was both a panelist and a "mystery guest" on CBS's What's My Line?

== Recording artist ==
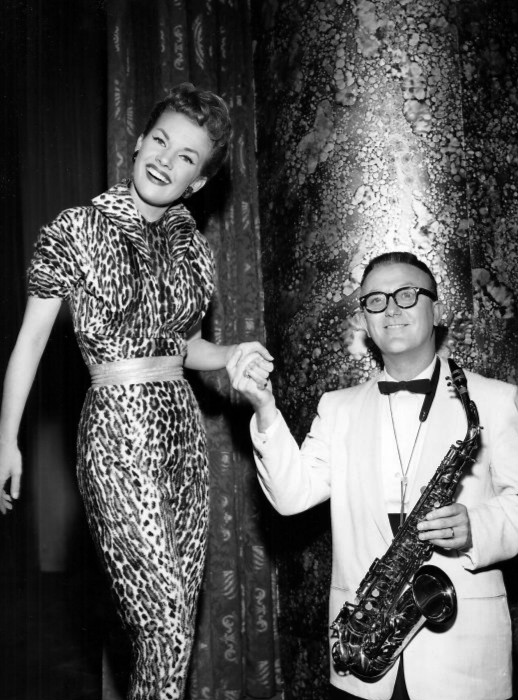
Storm with Billy Vaughn. The two wrote "You're My Baby Doll" and performed it on Storm's television show in 1958.

In Gallatin, Tennessee, in November 1954, a 10-year-old girl, Linda Wood, was watching Storm on a Sunday night television variety show, NBC's Colgate Comedy Hour, hosted by Gordon MacRae, singing one of the popular songs of the day. Linda's father asked her who was singing and was told it was Gale Storm from My Little Margie. Linda's father Randy Wood was president of Dot Records, and he liked Storm so much that he called to sign her before the end of the television show. Her first record, "I Hear You Knockin'", a cover of a rhythm and blues hit by Smiley Lewis, sold over a million copies.

The follow-up was a two-sided hit, with Storm covering Dean Martin's "Memories Are Made of This" backed with her cover of Gloria Mann's "Teen Age Prayer". That was followed by a hit cover of Frankie Lymon's "Why Do Fools Fall in Love". Storm's subsequent record sales began to slide, but soon rebounded with a cover of fellow Dot Records recording artist Bonnie Guitar's haunting ballad "Dark Moon" (1957), that went to No. 4 on the Billboard Hot 100. Storm had several other hits, headlined in Las Vegas and appeared in numerous stage plays. Storm recorded for five years with Dot Records, then gave up recording because of her husband's concerns with the time she had to devote to that career.

== Later years ==
Storm appeared on two episodes of Burke's Law, 1964 and 1965. Storm made occasional television appearances from 1979 to 1989, such as The Love Boat and Murder, She Wrote.

In March 1978 Storm performed as a guest artist in a principal role of Stephanie Dickinson in the stage production of Cactus Flower at Glendale Community College, outside Phoenix, Arizona. As reported in the campus newspaper El Tiempo Pasando, Storm surprised the cast of students by unexpectedly showing up for three days of rehearsal before scheduled.

In 1981, she published her autobiography, I Ain't Down Yet, which described her battle with alcoholism. She was also interviewed by author David C. Tucker for The Women Who Made Television Funny: Ten Stars of 1950s Sitcoms, published in 2007 by McFarland and Company.

Storm continued to make personal appearances and autographed photos at fan conventions, along with Charles Farrell from the My Little Margie series. She also attended events such as the Memphis Film Festival, Cinecon, the Friends of Old-Time Radio and the Mid-Atlantic Nostalgia Convention.

== Personal life ==
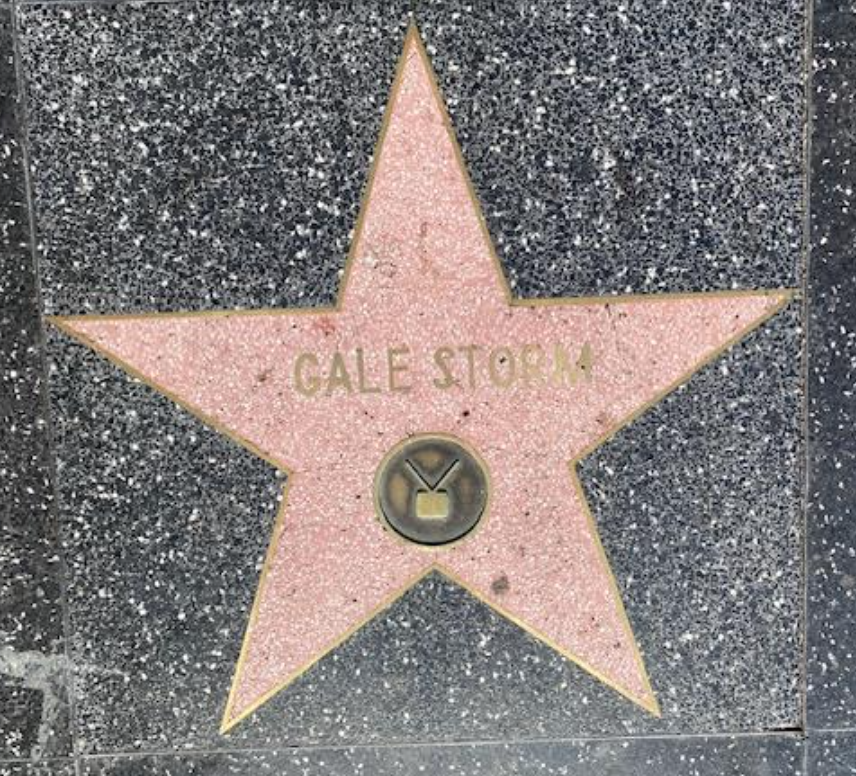
Gale Storm's television star on the Hollywood Walk of Fame.

Storm was married and widowed twice. In 1941, while still a teenager, she married Lee Bonnell (1918–1986), then an actor and later a businessman. They had four children: Peter, Phillip, Paul, and Susanna. In 1988, two years after she was widowed, she married Paul Masterson (1917–1996), who also predeceased her.

In her fifties, Storm struggled with alcoholism. She later said:

During the 1970s I experienced a terribly low and painful time of dealing with alcoholism. I had Lee's unfailing support through the entire ordeal. My treatment and recovery were more than rugged. At that time, there was such a stigma attached to alcoholism, particularly for women, that it could be hazardous to your reputation and career. I thank God daily that I have been fully recovered for more than 20 years. During my struggle, I had no idea of the blessing my experience could turn out to be! I've had the opportunity to share with others suffering with alcoholism the knowledge that there is help, hope, and an alcohol-free life awaiting them.

Storm later became an active member of the South Shores Baptist Church. She once said: "Life has been good and I thank God for His many blessings and the happy life He has given to me." Storm was a registered Republican and campaigned for U.S. Senator Barry M. Goldwater in the 1960s.

=== Death ===
After the death of her second husband in 1996, Storm lived alone in Monarch Beach, California, near two of her sons and their families, until failing health forced her into a convalescent home in Danville, California. She died there on June 27, 2009, at the age of 87.

Storm has three stars on the Hollywood Walk of Fame for her contributions to television, recordings, and radio.

== Filmography ==
- Tom Brown's School Days (1940)
- One Crowded Night (1940)
- Let's Go Collegiate (1941)
- City of Missing Girls (1941)
- Saddlemates (1941)
- Gambling Daughters (1941)
- Uncle Joe (1941)
- Red River Valley (1941)
- Jesse James at Bay (1941)
- Lure of the Islands (1942)
- Freckles Comes Home (1942)
- Man from Cheyenne (1942)
- Smart Alecks (1942)
- Foreign Agent (1942)
- Rhythm Parade (1942)
- Nearly Eighteen (1943)
- Where Are Your Children? (1943)
- Revenge of the Zombies (1943)
- Campus Rhythm (1943)
- The Crime Smasher (1943)
- G. I. Honeymoon (1945)
- Sunbonnet Sue (1945)
- Forever Yours (1945)
- Swing Parade of 1946 (1946)
- It Happened on Fifth Avenue (1947)
- The Dude Goes West (1948)
- Abandoned (1949)
- Stampede (1949)
- The Kid from Texas (1950)
- Curtain Call at Cactus Creek (1950)
- The Underworld Story (1950)
- Between Midnight and Dawn (1950)
- Al Jennings of Oklahoma (1951)
- The Texas Rangers (1951)
- Woman of the North Country (1952)

Television
| Year | Title | Role | Notes |
|---|---|---|---|
| 1952–1955 | My Little Margie | Margie Albright | 126 episodes |
| 1955 | The Ford Television Theatre | Hope Foster | 1 episode |
| 1956–1960 | The Gale Storm Show | Susanna Pomeroy | 143 episodes |
| 1964–1965 | Burke's Law | Honey Feather Leeps; Dr. Nonnie Harper | 2 episodes |
| 1979 | The Love Boat | Rose | 1 episode |
| 1989 | Murder, She Wrote | Maisie Mayberry | 1 episode |

== Recordings ==
=== Singles ===
| Year | Single (A-side, B-side) Both sides from same album except where indicated | US Top 100 | Album |
|---|---|---|---|
| 1955 | "I Hear You Knocking" b/w "Never Leave Me" (from Gale's Great Hits, not on Gale Storm) | 2 | Gale Storm (Dot, 1956) |
| 1955 | "Memories Are Made Of This" Gale Storm (Dot, 1956) | 5 | Gale Storm (Dot, 1956) |
| 1955 | "Teen Age Prayer" Gale Storm (Dot, 1956) | 6 | Gale Storm (Dot, 1956) |
| 1956 | "Why Do Fools Fall In Love" b/w "I Walk Alone" (Non-album track) | 9 | Gale's Great Hits (Dot) |
| 1956 | "Ivory Tower" Gale's Great Hits (Dot) b/w "I Ain't Gonna Worry" (Non-album track) | 6 | Gale's Great Hits (Dot) |
| 1956 | "Tell Me Why" b/w "Don't Be That Way" | 52 | Non-album tracks |
| 1956 | "Now Is The Hour" / | 59 | Gale's Great Hits (Dot) |
| 1956 | "A Heart Without A Sweetheart" | 79 | Non-album track |
| 1956 | "My Heart Belongs To You" b/w "Orange Blossoms" | | Gale's Great Hits (Dot) |
| 1957 | "Lucky Lips" / | 77 | Gale's Great Hits (Dot) |
| 1957 | "On Treasure Island" | 74 | Gale's Great Hits (Dot) |
| 1957 | "Dark Moon" b/w "A Little Too Late" (Non-album track) | 4 | Gale's Great Hits (Dot) |
| 1957 | "Love By The Jukebox Light" b/w "On My Mind Again" | | Gale Storm Sings (Dot, 1959) |
| 1957 | "Winter Warm" b/w "Go 'Way From My Window" (Non-album track) | | Gale Storm Sings (Dot, 1959) |
| 1957 | "South Of The Border" b/w "Soon I'll Wed My Love" | | Gale Storm Sings (Dot, 1959) |
| 1957 | "I Get That Feeling" b/w "A Farewell To Arms" | | Gale Storm Sings (Dot, 1959) |
| 1958 | "You" b/w "Angry" | | Gale Storm Sings (Dot, 1959) |
| 1958 | "Oh Lonely Crowd" b/w "Happiness Left Yesterday" | | Gale Storm Sings (Dot, 1959) |
| 1960 | "I Need You So" b/w "On Treasure Island" (from Gale's Great Hits) | | Non-album tracks |
| 1960 | "Please Help Me, I'm Falling" b/w "He Is There" | | Non-album tracks |

=== Albums ===
- Sentimental Me (Dot, 1956)
- Gale Storm (Dot, 1956)
- Gale's Great Hits (Dot, 1958)
- Softly and Tenderly (Dot, 1959)
- Gale Storm Sings (Dot, 1959)
- I Don't Want to Walk Without You (Hamilton, c. 1960s)
