= Fading Away =

Single by Will to Power

from the album Will to Power
- Released: 1989
- Recorded: 1987–1988
- Genre: Dance-pop, freestyle
- Length: 4:00 (album version)
- Label: Epic
- Songwriter: Bob Rosenberg
- Producer: Bob Rosenberg

Will to Power singles chronology
"Baby, I Love Your Way"/"Freebird Medley" (1988)	"Fading Away" (1989)	"I'm Not in Love" (1990)

Music video
- "Fading Away" on YouTube

"Fading Away" is a song by the Florida-based dance-pop group Will to Power. It appears on their 1988 self-titled debut album and was released as a single in early 1989.

The song reached #65 on the US pop chart in February 1989 and #84 on the UK Singles chart in March of that year. The song was more successful on dance charts in the US, reaching #2 on the Billboard Hot Dance Singles Sales chart and spending two weeks at top the Billboard Hot Dance Club Play chart. This was the group's second Hot Dance Club Play chart-topper, following "Say It's Gonna Rain" from 1988. Remixes for the track were done by Shep Pettibone.

== Track listing ==
U.S.A. 12 "Single

No.	Title	Length
1.	"Fading Away" (Power House Mix)	8:42
2.	"Fading Away" (Power House Dub)	6:43
3.	"Fading Away" (Big Beat Mix)	8:35
4.	"Fading Away" (The Rhythm Dub)	6:12

UK 12 "Single

No.	Title	Length
1.	"Fading Away" (Big Beat Mix)	8:34
2.	"Fading Away" (The Rhythm Dub)	6:12
3.	"Somebody Told Me"	3:30

The Netherlands 7 "Single

No.	Title	Length
1.	"Fading Away" (Radio Version I)	3:59
2.	"Fading Away" (Radio Version II)	3:56

== Charts ==
Chart (1989)	Peak Position
Australia (ARIA)	153
US Billboard Hot 100	65
US Hot Dance Music/Club Play	1
US Hot Dance Music/Maxi-Singles Sales	2
UK Singles Chart	84

== See also ==
- List of number-one dance hits (United States)
