= Extra Virgin (album) =

Studio album by Olive
- Released: 1996
- Recorded: 1994–January 1996
- Genre: Trip hop; breakbeat; drum and bass
- Length: 57:06
- Label: RCA
- Producer: Robin Taylor-Firth; Tim Kellett

Olive chronology
| Extra Virgin (1996) | Trickle (2000) |

Singles from Extra Virgin
- 1. "Miracle" Released: June 1996; 2. "You're Not Alone" Released: August 1996; 3. "Outlaw" Released: August 1997

Professional ratings
Review scores
| Source | Rating |
|---|---|
| AllMusic | 3/5 stars |
| Music Week (1996) | 4/5 stars |
| Music Week (1997) | 4/5 stars |
| Muzik | 2/5 stars |
| NME | 5/10 |
| People | (favourable) |
| Pitchfork | 5.2/10 |
| Synthesis | (favourable) |

Extra Virgin is the debut album by British trip hop band Olive, originally released in 1996. The album includes the single "You're Not Alone", which originally reached number 42 in the UK Singles Chart in 1996 and when re-released in 1997 it reached number one. Two other singles were released from the album: "Outlaw" (UK No. 14) and "Miracle" (UK No. 41). The trip hop influence of Massive Attack and Portishead, while in small quantities, are evident, mixed in with synth-based electronic dance.

The album was re-released in 1997 following the success of "You're Not Alone" and peaked at number 15 on the UK Albums Chart.

== Recording ==
Synthesizers used on the album are a Roland Juno-60, an E-mu Systems Vintage Keys, and an Akai S3000XL sampler. Mixing was done on a Mackie mixing console.

The band created some samples by recording live sounds, edited and subsequently filtered.

== Critical reception ==
Jeremy Helligar from People magazine wrote, "Ruth-Ann Boyle's warmed-honey vocals offset the iciness of titles like "Killing" and "Blood Red Tears"; her voice caresses arrangements at once gentle and unsettled. The intriguing combination makes Extra Virgin a bittersweet delight."

== Track listing ==
All tracks are written by Tim Kellett and Robin Taylor-Firth.

| No. | Title | Length |
|---|---|---|
| 1. | "Miracle" | 7:19 |
| 2. | "This Time" | 4:43 |
| 3. | "Safer Hands" | 4:53 |
| 4. | "Killing" | 4:12 |
| 5. | "You're Not Alone" | 4:13 |
| 6. | "Falling" | 4:53 |
| 7. | "Outlaw" | 5:28 |
| 8. | "Blood Red Tears" | 4:41 |
| 9. | "Curious" | 4:57 |
| 10. | "You Are Nothing" | 4:17 |
| 11. | "Muted" | 3:36 |
| 12. | "I Don't Think So" | 3:54 |
| Total length: | | 57:06 |

== Personnel ==
Olive

- Ruth-Ann Boyle – vocals
- Tim Kellett – flugelhorn, keyboards, trumpet
- Robin Taylor-Firth – keyboards

Other musicians

- Darren Campbell – bass guitar
- Duke Quartet – strings:
  - Louise Fuller – violin
  - Richard Koster – violin
  - Ivan McCready – cello
  - John Metcalfe – viola
- Tony Foster – bass, guitar
- Adrian Hackett – drums
- George Lambert – digital EQ
- Henrik Linnermann – flute
- James McNichol – assistant engineer
- Omith Mukherjee – guitar
- Heitor Teixeira Pereira – guitar
- Geoff Pesche – mastering
- David F. Revill – engineer
- Mark Sheridan – flute, guitar
- Leon Zervos – mastering

Metcalfe had previously played for The Durutti Column alongside Kellett, as had Pereira for Simply Red.

== Charts and sales ==
Chart performance of Extra Virgin
| Chart (1997) | Peak position |
|---|---|
| Australian Albums (ARIA) | 89 |
| Scottish Albums (OCC) | 58 |
| UK Albums (OCC) | 15 |

| Region | Certification | Certified units/sales |
|---|---|---|
| United States | — | 120,000 |
