= The Next Best Thing (soundtrack) =

Soundtrack album by various artists
- Released: February 22, 2000
- Recorded: 1997–1999
- Length: 49:31
- Labels: Maverick; Warner Bros.
- Producers: Madonna; William Orbit; various

Singles from The Next Best Thing (Music from the Motion Picture)
- 1. "American Pie" Released: February 2, 2000

The Next Best Thing is a soundtrack album released on February 22, 2000, by Maverick Records for the film The Next Best Thing starring Madonna. Executive-produced by Madonna, the album features a selection of tracks, including two new songs by Madonna: "Time Stood Still" (an original ballad co-written and co-produced with William Orbit) and a cover of Don McLean's "American Pie". The compilation also includes contributions from artists such as Christina Aguilera, Moby, Beth Orton, and Groove Armada. Critics generally praised the soundtrack for its cohesive and well-curated tracklist, with many highlighting its dance and electronica influences.

The album peaked at number 34 on the US Billboard 200 and sold over 155,000 copies within its first two months. "American Pie" became a chart-topping hit in multiple countries, including the UK, Germany, and Australia, while "Time Stood Still" reached the top three in the Czech Republic. The soundtrack also revived interest in McLean's original song and boosted sales for British band Olive's album Extra Virgin (1996).

== Critical reception ==
Professional ratings
Review scores
Source	Rating
AllMusic	3/5 stars
Baltimore Sun	3/4 stars
Calgary Herald	2.5/4 stars
Entertainment Weekly	B+
Indiana Gazette	B
Pittsburgh Post-Gazette	2.5/4 stars
Portland Press Herald	B+
The San Diego Union-Tribune	3.5/4 stars
Vancouver Sun	3.5/4 stars
Windsor Star	3.5/4 stars

The soundtrack received generally positive feedback from music journalists. Various reviewers praised Madonna's hand-pick selection and Madonna's songs. Portland Press Herald editor Michael Histen called it a "strong collection" and complimented the release as a "cohesive collection, and one of the better soundtracks in quite some time". The Washington Post's Richard Harrington, described "Most of this soundtrack has a cool luster to it". Pittsburgh Post-Gazette was overall positive towards the soundtrack, concluding "It's not great, but it's the next best thing". Kerry Gold, from Vancouver Sun, similarly described the album as "the next best thing to an excellent soundtrack".

Other reviewers praised soundtrack's dance-oriented songs. According to Billboard, the album is a "clubber's dream", and a "pop/dance punter's dream" that have "groovy mix of global beats" and "intertwines the old with the new". New York Daily News made similar remarks, complimenting the music style featured on the soundtrack, describing the album as "nouvelle electronica" and "a revolutionary mix of woozy electronics and retro-lounge sounds". Writing for The Baltimore Sun, J. D. Considine considered "is the next best thing to a new Madonna album", further describing "anyone who was a fan of her last album, 1998's Ray of Light "will find much to like about The Next Best Thing". J. D. Considine complimented "Time Stood Still" as "far more convincing" describing it as "mournful, Latin-tinged ballad". Jim Farber, in his review for Orlando Sentinel praised the soundtrack, and complimented "Time Stood Still" as "her best ballad since 'Take a Bow'". He stated, vocally Madonna "has never sounded more beautiful than on her other song".

In a mixed response, Howard Cohen from the Miami Herald commented "American Pie" is the "best thing" on the album while "the rest is the usual soundtrack grab-bag of found oldies". Kevin C. Johnson, from St. Louis Post-Dispatch was overall critical calling the soundtrack a "horrific material". Courier News referred the soundtrack is "as impersonal as the film's storyline".

== Commercial performance ==
The Next Best Thing debuted and peaked at number 34 on the US Billboard 200 albums chart, staying at least 8 weeks on the chart. Two months after its release, in April 2000, the album had sold over 155,000 copies in the US according to Nielsen SoundScan. The album also charted in Austria, Germany and elsewhere. The song "American Pie" climbed to the top of charts in the UK, Italy, Australia, Germany, and other territories. "Time Stood Still" also reached the number 3 in Czech Republic.

The soundtrack album helped boost US sales for British band Olive's album, Extra Virgin (1996). Billboard's Michael Paoletta commented, the band "stirred much interest of its sophomore album". "American Pie" also revived "interest in [Don] McLean's magnum opus" according to publications such as Broadcast Music, Inc. (BMI), and writer Nat Shapiro. Fred Bronson, chart columnist of Billboard, noted Madonna was the first artist to have a number-one song of an "American Pie" cover in the UK. It also extended Madonna's record of most-number one singles in the UK by a female artist; at that time, double that Whitney Houston and Kylie Minogue, with four each.

== Track listing ==
No.	Title	Performer(s)	Length
1.	"Boom Boom Ba"	Métisse
2.	"Bongo Bong"	Manu Chao
3.	"Don't Make Me Love You ('Til I'm Ready)"	Christina Aguilera
4.	"American Pie"	Madonna
5.	"This Life"	Mandalay
6.	"If Everybody Looked the Same"	Groove Armada
7.	"Why Does My Heart Feel So Bad?"	Moby
8.	"I'm Not in Love"	Olive
9.	"Stars All Seem to Weep"	Beth Orton
10.	"Time Stood Still"	Madonna
11.	"Swayambhu"	Solar Twins
12.	"Forever and Always"	Gabriel Yared
Total length:			49:31

== Charts ==
Weekly chart performance for The Next Best Thing
Chart (2000)	Peak position
Austrian Albums (Ö3 Austria)	16
Canada Top Albums/CDs (RPM)	16
European Albums (Eurotipsheet)	61
German Albums (Offizielle Top 100)	19
Hungarian Albums (MAHASZ)	31
Swiss Albums (Schweizer Hitparade)	55
UK Compilation Albums (Official Charts)	24
US Billboard 200	34

== Sales ==
Region	Certification	Certified units/sales
Mexico	—	40,000 (Note: Mexican sales as of June 2000.)
United States	—	155,000 (Note: US sales as of April 2000, according to Nielsen SoundScan.)
