= Teen Age Prayer =

Single by Gale Storm

from the album Gale Storm
- B-side: "Memories Are Made of This"
- Released: November 1955
- Genre: Traditional pop
- Length: 2:15
- Label: Dot
- Songwriter(s): Bix Reichner, Bernie Lowe

Gale Storm singles chronology
"I Hear You Knocking" (1955)	"Teen Age Prayer" (1955)	"Why Do Fools Fall in Love" (1956)

"Teen Age Prayer" is a song written by Bix Reichner and Bernie Lowe and performed by Gale Storm. It reached #6 on the U.S. pop chart in 1955. The song was featured on her 1956 album Gale Storm.

== Other charting versions ==
- Gloria Mann featuring the Sid Bass Orchestra released a version of the song which reached #19 on the U.S. pop chart in 1955.
- Kitty White released a version of the song which reached #68 on the U.S. pop chart in 1955.

== Other versions ==
- Thelma Carpenter released a version of the song as a single in 1961, but it did not chart.
- Roberta Shore released a version of the song as a single in 1961, but it did not chart.
- Johnny Nash released a version of the song on his 2011 compilation album The Young Johnny Nash Definitive Early Album Collection.

== In popular culture ==
- Rachel Sweet sang a version of the song in the 1990 film Cry-Baby.
