= Will to Power (Will to Power album) =

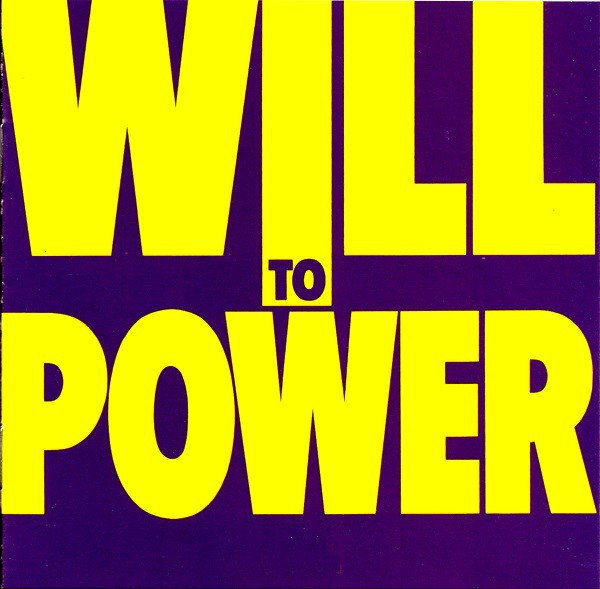
- Standard artwork (vinyl release pictured)

Studio album by Will to Power
- Released: March 1988
- Genres: Dance-pop, adult contemporary
- Length: 41:27
- Label: Epic
- Producer: Bob Rosenberg

Will to Power chronology
Will to Power (1988)	Journey Home (1990)

Singles from Will to Power
- 1. "Dreamin'" Released: 1987; 2. "Say It's Gonna Rain" Released: 1988; 3. "Baby, I Love Your Way/Freebird Medley" Released: November 29, 1988; 4. "Fading Away" Released: 1989

Professional ratings
Review scores
Source	Rating
AllMusic	4/5 stars

Will to Power is the debut studio album by the American dance-pop band Will to Power. It was released in March 1988 by Epic Records. The album peaked at No. 68 on the Billboard 200 albums chart.

Will to Power contains the band's No. 1 song on the Billboard Hot 100 chart, "Baby, I Love Your Way/Freebird Medley", the most successful single released by them today, coming to stay for a week in the first position of the Billboard Hot 100, as well as two songs that reached No. 1 on the Billboard Hot Dance Club Play chart, ("Say It's Gonna Rain" that was the first single of them coming in the first position on the dance chart and "Fading Away" that reached first on the dance chart and achieved moderate success on the Billboard Hot 100). "Dreamin'" managed to enter the Billboard Hot 100 although it has achieved more success in the dance charts. According to Fred Bronson's 5th edition of The Billboard Book of #1 Hits, released in 2003, "Will to Power was a trio when the medley hit number one, consisting of (Bob) Rosenberg, (Suzi) Carr and a DJ known as Dr. J."

== Track listing ==
No.	Title	Writer(s)	Length
1.	"Dreamin'"	Bob Rosenberg	4:12
2.	"Searchin'"	Rosenberg	4:28
3.	"Baby, I Love Your Way/Freebird Medley"	Allen Collins, Peter Frampton, Ronnie Van Zant	4:07
4.	"Somebody Told Me"	Rosenberg	3:30
5.	"Fading Away"	Rosenberg	4:00
6.	"Say It's Gonna Rain"	Rosenberg	3:53
7.	"Zarathustra"	Rosenberg	5:27
8.	"Show Me the Way"	Willie B. Brown, Suzi Carr	3:52
9.	"Strangers"	Rosenberg	3:54
10.	"Anti-Social"	Rosenberg	4:23

Japanese edition
No.	Title	Length
1.	"Say It's Gonna Rain" (Popstand Remix)	7:25

== Personnel ==
=== Will to Power ===
- Vocals: Ale Lorenzo; Elin Michaels; Suzi Carr; Rachel Newman; April Newman; Betty Wright; Donna Allen; Lori Miller; Harry King and Dee Dee Wilde; and Cirsten Steinhour
- Bob Rosenberg: PKA: Will to Power: Vocals / Writer/ Producer * Signed exclusively through CBS Records 4/1987

=== Additional musicians ===
- Engineer and Mix Engineer: Mike Couzzi
- Keyboards & Programming: Lawrence Dermer; Winston Johnson; Lester Mendez; David Rosenthal; and Fro Sosa
- Guitar: Gary King
- Turntables: David Hobbs
- Post Production Edits: Kevin Fluornoy and Wayne Walters

== Charts ==
Chart performance for Will to Power
Chart (1988–1989)	Peak position
Australian Albums (ARIA)	106
Norwegian Albums (VG-lista)	8
U.S. The Billboard 200	68
