= My Little Margie =

- Genre: Sitcom
- Created by: Frank Fox
- Directed by: Nate Watt; Hal Yates
- Starring: Gale Storm; Charles Farrell
- Theme music composer: Alexander Laszlo
- Country of origin: United States
- Original language: English
- No. of seasons: 4
- No. of episodes: 126

Production
- Executive producers: Roland D. Reed; Hal Roach; Hal Roach, Jr. Guy V. Thayer, Jr.
- Camera setup: Multi-camera
- Running time: 25 minutes
- Production companies: Roland Reed TV Productions; Rovan Films

Original release
- Network: CBS (1952–1953); NBC (1953–1955)
- Release: June 16, 1952 – August 24, 1955

My Little Margie is an American television sitcom starring Gale Storm and Charles Farrell that alternated between CBS and NBC from 1952 to 1955. The series was created by Frank Fox and produced in Los Angeles, California, at Hal Roach Studios by Hal Roach Jr., and Roland D. Reed.

My Little Margie premiered on CBS as a summer replacement for I Love Lucy on June 16, 1952, under the sponsorship of Philip Morris cigarettes (when the series moved to NBC for its third season in the fall of 1953, Scott Paper Company became its sponsor).

In an unusual move, the series – with the same leads – aired original episodes on CBS Radio, concurrently with the TV broadcasts, from December 1952 through August 1955. Only 23 radio broadcasts are known to exist in recorded form.

== Synopsis ==
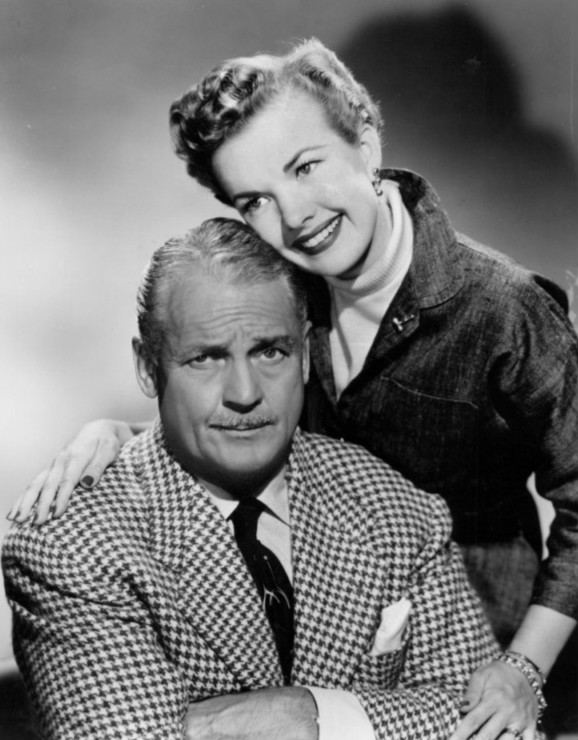
Vern and Margie Albright

Set in New York City, the series stars Gale Storm as 21-year-old Margie Albright and former silent film star Charles Farrell as her widowed father, 50-year-old Vern Albright. They share an apartment at the Carlton Arms Hotel. Vern Albright is the vice president of the investment firm of Honeywell and Todd, where his bosses are George Honeywell (Clarence Kolb) and Westley Todd (George Meader). Roberta Townsend (Hillary Brooke) is Vern's girlfriend, and Margie's boyfriend is Freddy Wilson (Don Hayden). Mrs. Odetts (played by Gertrude Hoffmann on TV, Verna Felton on radio) is the Albrights' next-door neighbor and Margie's sidekick in madcap capers reminiscent of Lucy and Ethel in I Love Lucy. When Margie realizes she has blundered or gotten into trouble, she makes an odd trilling sound.

Other cast members include Willie Best, who plays the elevator operator, Dian Fauntelle, and silent film star ZaSu Pitts. Scottish actor Andy Clyde, prior to The Real McCoys, appears in the 1954 episode, "Margie and the Bagpipes".

My Little Margie finished at number 29 in the Nielsen ratings for the 1954–1955 television season, and even more impressively, at number six in Nielsen's radio estimates for the 1954–55 season. Despite this success, the series was canceled in 1955. Gale Storm went on to star in The Gale Storm Show which ran for 143 episodes from 1956 to 1960. ZaSu Pitts joined Gale Storm in this series too, originally entitled Oh! Susanna.

The show has been compared with two other 1950s sitcoms that aired at the same time, I Married Joan and Life with Elizabeth. All three programs were inspired by the success of I Love Lucy, but despite their own merits, have fallen into obscurity only to gain some popularity after entering the public domain. I Love Lucy, however, is still under copyright in the United States.

The show had two different openings and endings. Initially, the show opened with two photos, which come to life; first, Vern talks about the difficulty of raising Margie, then Margie's photo comes to life and she explains the difficulty of making her father behave the way she wants him to. This apparently ended within a year and the photos were changed and did not come to life.

== Main cast ==
- Gale Storm as Margie Albright
- Charles Farrell as Vern Albright
- Clarence Kolb as George Honeywell
- Don Hayden as Freddie Wilson

== Theme song ==
The program's theme song was originally titled "Bows and Strings in Teasing" by its composer, Alexander Laszlo, when he composed it for a 1946 Republic picture, The French Key. When My Little Margie contracted to use his music, Laszlo wrote a new arrangement with added bars of music, which then became the "My Little Margie Theme" from 1952 to 1955.

Most of the surviving radio episodes are edited versions aired on the Armed Forces Radio Service (AFRS). CBS destroyed thousands of broadcasts from this period, so in many cases all that have survived have been the AFRS versions. The AFRS versions used the 1920s song "Margie" as a music fill at the end of the episode to take up the time that would have had commercials in the original CBS version.

== Syndication ==
After the series was canceled in 1955, Official Films distributed it in syndication. My Little Margie has aired on local TV stations, often paired with I Married Joan. Both series aired on CBN during the 1980s and then on ION. AMGTV currently carries both series daily.

== Comic books ==
From July 1954 to November 1964, Charlton Comics published 54 issues of My Little Margie.
