= The Gale Storm Show =

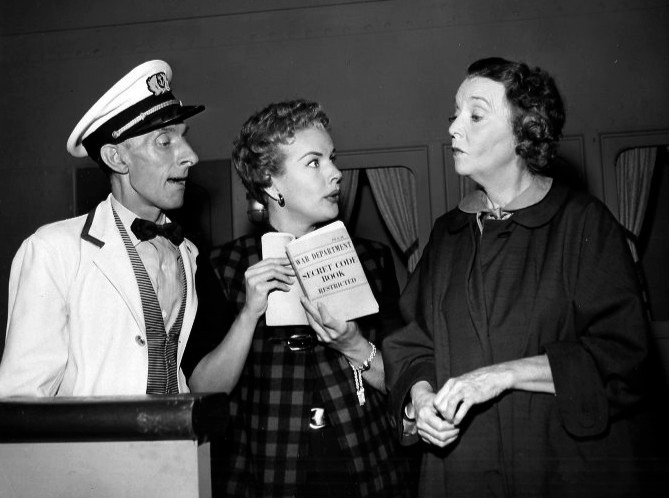
- James Fairfax, Gale Storm, and ZaSu Pitts (1956)
- Also known as: Oh, Susanna
- Genre: Sitcom
- Created by: Lee Karson
- Starring: Gale Storm; ZaSu Pitts; Roy Roberts; James Fairfax
- Composer: Leon Klatzkin
- Country of origin: United States
- Original language: English
- No. of seasons: 4
- No. of episodes: 125

Production
- Executive producer: Hal Roach
- Producers: Hal Roach, Jr.; Lou Derman; Alex Gottlieb
- Running time: 26 minutes
- Production companies: Hal Roach Studios; Independent Television Corporation

Original release
- Network: CBS
- Release: September 29, 1956 – April 11, 1959
- Network: ABC
- Release: October 1, 1959 – September 22, 1960

The Gale Storm Show is an American sitcom starring Gale Storm. The series premiered on September 29, 1956, and ran until 1960 for 125 half-hour black-and-white episodes, initially on CBS and in its last year on ABC. Its title is also seen as The Gale Storm Show: Oh, Susanna.

The Gale Storm Show was produced initially by Hal Roach Studios. The Roach company later sold the program to Independent Television Corporation.

The series was aired under the title Oh, Susanna in syndication.

== Synopsis ==
The series is based on a cruise director, Susanna Pomeroy (Storm), on a ship traveling around the world. A cast of regular characters inhabits the ship and new situations are created as the ship moors in ports. Unlike her previous role on My Little Margie, Storm's character emits a shrill, two-fingered whistle to get people's attention. On her previous show, she would make a Trilling sound when in trouble.

The series finished at No. 16 in the Nielsen ratings for the 1957–1958 season.

== Cast ==
- Gale Storm as Susanna Pomeroy
- ZaSu Pitts as Elvira Nugent
- Roy Roberts as Captain Huxley
- James Fairfax as Cedric

=== Notable guest stars ===
- Pat Boone
- Francis De Sales
- William Frawley
- Lorne Greene
- Ron Hagerthy as Sergeant Rickie Hayland in "Wedding at Sea" (1959)
- Rodolfo Hoyos, Jr.
- Boris Karloff
- Peggy Knudsen
- Doug McClure
- Patrick McVey as Reid in "Girls! Girls! Girls!" (1957)
- Robby the Robot
- Frank Wilcox
- Robert Warwick

== Episodes ==
=== Season 1 (1956–57) ===
No. overall	No. in season	Title	Directed by	Written by	Original release date
1	1	"Italian Movie Actress"	William A. Seiter	Phil Shuken & Lee Karson	September 29, 1956
2	2	"The Chimpanzee"	John Rich	Al Gordon & Hal Goldman	October 6, 1956
3	3	"Passenger Incognito"	John Rich	George Carleton Brown & Frank Gill, Jr.	October 13, 1956
4	4	"Bonnie Lassie"	Charles Barton	Nathaniel Curtis & Erna Lazarus	October 20, 1956
5	5	"Too Many Maharanis"	Unknown	Larry Rhine & Bill Freedman	October 27, 1956
6	6	"Nicked in Naples"	Charles Barton	Lee Karson & Ben Gershman	November 10, 1956
7	7	"The Immigrants"	William A. Seiter	Bernard Ederer & Bob White	November 17, 1956
8	8	"Susanna Strikes Back"	William A. Seiter	Bill Freedman & Larry Rhine	November 24, 1956
9	9	"Hold That Tiger"	Unknown	Unknown	December 1, 1956
10	10	"The Witch Doctor"	William A. Seiter	John L. Greene	December 8, 1956
11	11	"A Night in Monte Carlo"	William A. Seiter	Bill Freedman & Larry Rhine	December 15, 1956
12	12	"Capri"	Charles Barton	Al Gordon & Hal Goldman	December 22, 1956
13	13	"The Magician"	Charles Barton	Lee Karson & Elon Packard	December 29, 1956
14	14	"Girls! Girls! Girls!"	Charles Barton	Nathaniel Curtis & Erna Lazarus	January 5, 1957
15	15	"Desirable Alien"	Unknown	Unknown	January 12, 1957
16	16	"Foreign Intrigue"	Unknown	Unknown	January 19, 1957
17	17	"Goodbye Kiss"	Unknown	Unknown	January 26, 1957
18	18	"Super Snoop"	William A. Seiter	Bill Freedman & Larry Rhine	February 2, 1957
19	19	"Checkmate"	Unknown	Unknown	February 9, 1957
20	20	"Swiss Miss"	William A. Seiter	Bill Freedman & Larry Rhine	February 16, 1957
21	21	"The Blarney Stone"	Charles Barton	Unknown	February 23, 1957
22	22	"Volcano"	William A. Seiter	John Fenton Murray	March 2, 1957
23	23	"Indian Giver"	William A. Seiter	Hal Fimberg	March 9, 1957
24	24	"Susanna, the Chaperone"	Unknown	Unknown	March 16, 1957
25	25	"Gypping the Gypsies"	William A. Seiter	Bill Freedman & Larry Rhine	March 23, 1957
26	26	"Maid in Sweden"	William A. Seiter	Bill Freedman & Larry Rhine	March 30, 1957
27	27	"Trouble in Trinidad"	Charles Barton	Benedict Freedman & John Fenton Murray	April 6, 1957
28	28	"Model Apartment"	William A. Seiter	John Fenton Murray	April 13, 1957
29	29	"Singapore Fling"	Charles Barton	Larry Rhine & Bill Freedman	April 20, 1957
30	30	"The Parisian Touch"	Charles Barton	Larry Rhine & Bill Freedman	April 27, 1957
31	31	"Action in Acapulco"	William A. Seiter	Story by : Fredrick Fox & Warren Spector; Teleplay by : Larry Rhine & Bill Freedman	May 4, 1957
32	32	"Wedding in Majorca"	Charles Barton	Larry Rhine & Bill Freedman	May 18, 1957
33	33	"Sing, Susanna, Sing"	William A. Seiter	Bernard Ederer & Robert White and Alex Gottlieb	May 25, 1957
34	34	"Stop, Thief"	William A. Seiter	Alex Gottlieb & Hal Fimberg	June 1, 1957
35	35	"'Alp, 'Alp"	William A. Seiter	John Fenton Murray	June 8, 1957
36	36	"A Hit in Tahiti"	Charles Barton	Story by : Frank Gill, Jr. & George Carleton Brown; Teleplay by : Alex Gottlieb and Frank Gill, Jr. & George Carleton Brown	June 15, 1957

=== Season 2 (1957–58) ===
No. overall	No. in season	Title	Directed by	Written by	Original release date
37	1	"Pat on the Back"	William A. Seiter	Hal Fimberg	September 14, 1957
38	2	"Susanna Plays Cupid"	Unknown	Unknown	September 21, 1957
39	3	"Pirate Treasure"	William A. Seiter	Bill Freedman & Larry Rhine	September 28, 1957
40	4	"Susanna Strikes Oil"	Unknown	Unknown	October 5, 1957
41	5	"It's Only Money"	Unknown	Unknown	October 12, 1957
42	6	TBA	Unknown	Unknown	October 19, 1957
43	7	"Susanna's Baby"	William A. Seiter	Alex Gottlieb	October 26, 1957
44	8	"A Lass in Alaska"	Unknown	Unknown	November 2, 1957
45	9	"The Phantom Valice"	Unknown	Unknown	November 9, 1957
46	10	"For Money or Love"	William A. Seiter	John L. Greene	November 16, 1957
47	11	"Aladdin's Lamp"	Unknown	Unknown	November 23, 1957
48	12	"The Kid from Korea"	Unknown	Unknown	November 30, 1957
49	13	"Mardi Gras"	Unknown	Unknown	December 7, 1957
50	14	"Dutch Treatment"	Unknown	Unknown	December 14, 1957
51	15	"Susanna Goes Native"	Unknown	Unknown	December 21, 1957
52	16	"Friday the Thirteenth"	Unknown	Unknown	December 28, 1957
53	17	"The Ouija Board"	Unknown	Unknown	January 4, 1958
54	18	TBA	Unknown	Unknown	January 11, 1958
55	19	"Lovey-Dovey"	William A. Seiter	Hal Fimberg	January 18, 1958
56	20	"The Case of the Chinese Puzzle"	Unknown	Unknown	January 25, 1958
57	21	"Royal Welcome"	Unknown	Unknown	February 1, 1958
58	22	"Susanna Takes a Husband"	Unknown	Unknown	February 8, 1958
59	23	"Taking Ways"	Unknown	Unknown	February 15, 1958
60	24	"Ride 'Em, Cowgirl"	Unknown	Unknown	February 22, 1958
61	25	"Bye, Bye, Banshee"	Unknown	Unknown	March 1, 1958
62	26	"A Beautiful Friendship"	Unknown	Unknown	March 8, 1958
63	27	"Ghosts Aboard"	Unknown	Unknown	March 15, 1958
64	28	"How to Catch a Man"	Unknown	Unknown	March 22, 1958
65	29	"Our Dear Captain"	Unknown	Unknown	March 29, 1958
66	30	"Susanna and the Pirates"	Unknown	Unknown	April 5, 1958
67	31	"Happily Unmarried"	Unknown	Unknown	April 12, 1958
68	32	"Bamboozled in Bombay"	Unknown	Unknown	April 26, 1958
69	33	"Not So Innocents Abroad"	Unknown	Unknown	May 3, 1958
70	34	"A Date with a Wolf"	Unknown	Unknown	May 10, 1958
71	35	"Beat the Band"	Unknown	Unknown	May 31, 1958

=== Season 3 (1958–59) ===
No. overall	No. in season	Title	Directed by	Written by	Original release date
72	1	"Diamonds Are a Girl's Best Friend"	Unknown	Unknown	September 6, 1958
73	2	"Happy Birthday, Captain"	Unknown	Unknown	September 13, 1958
74	3	"The Truth Machine"	Unknown	Unknown	September 20, 1958
75	4	"Hayride Ahoy"	Unknown	Unknown	September 27, 1958
76	5	"Painted in Paris"	Unknown	Unknown	October 4, 1958
77	6	TBA	Unknown	Unknown	October 11, 1958
78	7	"Secret Assignment"	Unknown	Unknown	October 18, 1958
79	8	"Heaven Scent"	Unknown	Unknown	October 25, 1958
80	9	"Love and Kisses"	Unknown	Unknown	November 1, 1958
81	10	TBA	Unknown	Unknown	November 8, 1958
82	11	"The Case of the Music Box Thief"	Unknown	Unknown	November 15, 1958
83	12	"Susanna the Matchmaker"	Unknown	Unknown	November 22, 1958
84	13	"Adventure in Alaska"	Unknown	Unknown	December 6, 1958
85	14	"Robot from Inner Space"	Unknown	Unknown	December 13, 1958
86	15	"Don't Give Up the Ship"	Unknown	Unknown	December 20, 1958
87	16	"Make Mine Music"	Unknown	Unknown	December 27, 1958
88	17	"How to Make Enemies"	William A. Seiter	Larry Rhine & Bill Freedman	January 3, 1959
89	18	"One Captain Too Many"	William A. Seiter	Larry Rhine & Bill Freedman	January 10, 1959
90	19	"On the Dot"	William A. Seiter	Alex Gottlieb	January 17, 1959
91	20	"The Honeymoon Suite"	Unknown	Unknown	January 24, 1959
92	21	"It's Murder, My Dear"	Unknown	Unknown	January 31, 1959
93	22	"The Battle of the Bull Run"	Unknown	Unknown	February 7, 1959
94	23	"Jailmates"	Unknown	Unknown	February 28, 1959
95	24	"An Old Chinese Custom"	Unknown	Unknown	March 7, 1959
96	25	"Dutch Treat"	Unknown	Unknown	March 14, 1959
97	26	"Alias Susanna Valentine"	Unknown	Unknown	March 21, 1959
98	27	"Clip That Coupon"	Unknown	Unknown	March 28, 1959
99	28	"Who Stole That Melody?"	Unknown	Unknown	April 4, 1959
100	29	"Susanna, the Babysitter"	Unknown	Unknown	April 11, 1959

=== Season 4 (1959–60) ===
No. overall	No. in season	Title	Directed by	Written by	Original release date
101	1	"One, Two, Ski!"	William A. Seiter	Larry Rhine & Bill Freedman	October 1, 1959
102	2	"The Card Sharp"	James V. Kern	Larry Rhine & Bill Freedman	October 8, 1959
103	3	"The Million Dollar Mutt"	Richard Kinon	Story by : Charles Hoffman; Teleplay by : Larry Rhine & Bill Freedman	October 15, 1959
104	4	"Come Back Little Beatnik"	William A. Seiter	Unknown	October 22, 1959
105	5	"Calling Scotland Yard"	William A. Seiter	John Fenton Murray	October 29, 1959
106	6	"Happy Horoscope"	William A. Seiter	Unknown	November 5, 1959
107	7	"Nugey, Come Home"	Richard Kinon	Larry Rhine & Milton Pascal	November 12, 1959
108	8	"The Swedish Steward"	Unknown	Unknown	November 19, 1959
109	9	"Goodbye, Doctor"	James V. Kern	Martin Ragaway & Joe Quillan	November 26, 1959
110	10	"Family Reunion"	James V. Kern	Larry Rhine & Milton Pascal	December 3, 1959
111	11	"Wedding at Sea"	Unknown	Unknown	December 10, 1959
112	12	"Spanish Souvenir"	Unknown	Unknown	December 17, 1959
113	13	"Captain Daddy"	Richard Kinon	Joel Kane & Lou Derman	December 24, 1959
114	14	"Susanna's True Confession"	Unknown	Unknown	December 31, 1959
115	15	"African Drums"	Unknown	Unknown	January 7, 1960
116	16	"No Tears for the Captain"	Unknown	Unknown	January 14, 1960
117	17	"Love by Yiminy"	Unknown	Unknown	January 21, 1960
118	18	"A Trip for Auntie"	Unknown	Unknown	January 28, 1960
119	19	"Birthday for Gino"	Unknown	Unknown	February 4, 1960
120	20	"S.O.S. Dad"	Unknown	Unknown	February 11, 1960
121	21	"Mother Steps Out"	Unknown	Unknown	February 18, 1960
122	22	"Captain Courageous"	Unknown	Unknown	February 25, 1960
123	23	"One Coin in the Fountain"	William A. Seiter	Herb Finn & William Freedman	March 3, 1960
124	24	"Made in Hong Kong"	Austen Jewell	Seaman Jacobs & Si Rose	March 10, 1960
125	25	"It's Magic"	Robert Altman	Herb Finn & William Freedman	March 17, 1960
126	26	"Show Biz"	James V. Kern	Larry Rhine & Milton Pascal	March 24, 1960

== Award nominations ==
Year	Result	Award	Category	Recipient
1959	Nominated	Emmy Award	Best Supporting Actress (Continuing Character) in a Comedy Series	ZaSu Pitts
