= Gloria Mann =

American pop singer

Gloria Mann was an American pop singer. She reached the U.S. Billboard Hot 100 in 1955, and was best known for her cover version of "Earth Angel." She was signed by Decca Records. On Decca records she had a chart entry with the cover version of Why Do Fools Fall In Love (Decca 29832). It entered the Billboard Hot 100 on March, 10th 1956 and reached position 59.

== Early life, family and education ==
She was born in Philadelphia, Pennsylvania.

== Career ==
Mann scored two hits on the US Billboard Hot 100 in 1955. The first was a cover version of "Earth Angel", which reached number 18. Later that year, "A Teenage Prayer" peaked at number 19; this featured Sid Bass leading the backing orchestra. Both were released on Sound Records.

In 2003, a compilation album, Don't Call Me Barry: The Best of Gloria Mann was released.

== Personal life ==
Mann married and raised two sons. The family relocated from Philadelphia to Miami. Her son, Bob Rosenberg, is known for forming the pop music group Will to Power.

She died in December 2001.
