= I'm Not in Love =

1975 song by 10cc

- One of the side-A labels of the original 1975 UK single

Single by 10cc

from the album The Original Soundtrack
- B-side: "Good News"; "Channel Swimmer" (US and Canada only)
- Released: 23 May 1975
- Recorded: 1974–1975
- Studio: Strawberry Studios (Stockport, Greater Manchester, England)
- Genre: Progressive pop; pop; soft rock
- Length: 6:08 (album version); 3:42 (US and Canada edit)
- Label: Mercury
- Songwriters: Eric Stewart; Graham Gouldman
- Producer: 10cc

10cc singles chronology
"Life Is a Minestrone" (1975)	"I'm Not in Love" (1975)	"Art for Art's Sake" (1975)

Audio sample
- file; help

"I'm Not in Love" is a song by the English band 10cc, written by band members Eric Stewart and Graham Gouldman. It is known for its innovative and distinctive backing track, composed mostly of multitracked vocals.

Released in the UK in May 1975 as the second single from the band's third album, The Original Soundtrack, it became the second of the group's three number-one singles in the UK between 1973 and 1978, topping the UK Singles Chart for two weeks. "I'm Not in Love" became the band's breakthrough hit outside the United Kingdom, topping the charts in Canada and Ireland as well as peaking within the top 10 of the charts in several other countries, including Australia, West Germany, New Zealand, Norway and the United States.

Written mostly by Stewart as a response to his wife's declaration that he did not tell her often enough that he loved her, "I'm Not in Love" was originally conceived as a bossa nova song played on guitars, but the other two members of the band, Kevin Godley and Lol Creme, were not impressed with the idea for the track and it was abandoned. However, after hearing members of their staff continue to sing the melody around their studio, Stewart persuaded the group to give the song another chance, to which Godley replied that for the song to work it needed to be radically changed, and suggested that the band should try to create a new version using just voices.

== Writing and composition ==
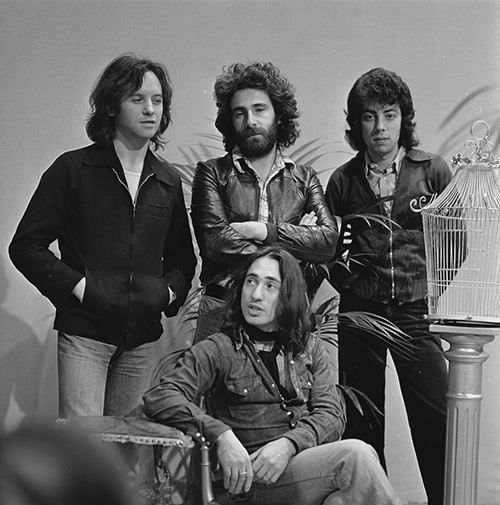
Band members of 10cc in 1974

Stewart came up with the idea for the song after his wife, to whom he had been married for eight years at that point, asked him why he did not say "I love you" more often to her. Stewart said, "I had this crazy idea in my mind that repeating those words would somehow degrade the meaning, so I told her, 'Well, if I say every day "I love you, darling, I love you, blah, blah, blah", it's not gonna mean anything eventually'. That statement led me to try to figure out another way of saying it, and the result was that I chose to say 'I'm not in love with you', while subtly giving all the reasons throughout the song why I could never let go of this relationship."

Stewart wrote most of the melody and the lyrics on the guitar before taking it to the studio, where Gouldman offered to help him complete the song. Gouldman suggested some different chords for the melody, and also came up with the intro and the bridge section of the song. Stewart said that the pair spent two or three days writing the song, which at that point had a bossa nova rhythm and used principally guitars, before playing it to Godley and Creme. Stewart recorded a version with the other three members playing the song in the studio on traditional instruments – Creme on guitar, Gouldman on bass, and Godley on drums – but Godley and Creme disliked the song, particularly Godley, as Stewart later recalled: "He said, 'It's crap', and I said, 'Oh right, OK, have you got anything constructive to add to that? Can you suggest anything?' He said, 'No. It's not working, man. It's just crap, right? Chuck it.' And we did. We threw it away and we even erased it, so there's no tape of that bossa nova version."

Having abandoned "I'm Not in Love", Stewart and Gouldman turned their attention to the track "Une Nuit a Paris", which Godley and Creme had been working on and which would later become the opening track on The Original Soundtrack album. However, Stewart noticed that members of staff in the band's Strawberry Studios were still singing the melody of "I'm Not in Love", and this convinced him to ask the other members of the group to consider reviving the song. Godley was still skeptical, but came up with a radical idea, telling Stewart, "I tell you what, the only way that song is gonna work is if we totally fuck it up and we do it like nobody has ever recorded a thing before. Let's not use instruments. Let's try to do it all with voices." Although taken aback by the suggestion, Stewart and the others agreed to try Godley's idea and create "a wall of sound" of vocals that would form the focal point of the record.

== Recording ==
Stewart spent three weeks recording Gouldman, Godley and Creme singing "ahhh" 16 times for each note of the chromatic scale, building up a "choir" of 48 voices for each note of the scale. The main problem facing the band was how to keep the vocal notes going for an infinite length of time, but Creme suggested that they could get around this issue by using tape loops. Stewart created loops of about 12 feet in length by feeding the loop at one end through the tape heads of the stereo recorder in the studio, and at the other end through a capstan roller fixed to the top of a microphone stand, and tensioned the tape. In this way, the 'blip' caused by the splice in each tape loop could be drowned out by the rest of the backing track, providing that the splice in each loop did not coincide with any of the others. Having created twelve tape loops, one for each of the 12 notes of the chromatic scale, Stewart played each loop through a separate channel of the mixing desk. This effectively turned the mixing desk into a musical instrument complete with all the notes of the chromatic scale, which the four members together then "played", fading up three or four channels at a time to create "chords" for the song's melody. Stewart put tape across the bottom of each channel so that it was impossible to completely fade down the tracks for each note, resulting in the constant background of vocals heard throughout the song. The composer and music theory professor Thomas MacFarlane considered the resulting "ethereal voices" with distorted synthesised effects a major influence on Billy Joel's hit ballad "Just the Way You Are", released two years later.

A basic guide track was recorded first in order to help create the melody using the vocals, but the proper instrumentation was added after the vocals had been recorded. In keeping with Godley's idea to focus on the voices, only a few instruments were used: a Fender Rhodes electric piano played by Stewart, a Gibson 335 electric guitar and a Rickenbacker 4001 bass guitar played by Gouldman for the rhythm melody, and a bass drum sound played by Godley on a Moog synthesiser which Creme had recently purchased and learned how to program. The drum sound was very soft and more akin to a heartbeat, in order not to overpower the rest of the track. Creme played piano during the bridge and the middle eight, where it replicated the melody of lyrics that had been discarded. The middle eight is also the only part of the song that contains a bass guitar line, played by Gouldman. A toy music box was recorded and double tracked out of phase for the middle eight and the outro.

Once the musical backing had been completed Stewart recorded the lead vocal and Godley and Creme the backing vocals, but even though the song was finished Godley felt it was still lacking something. Stewart said, "Lol remembered he had said something into the grand piano mics when he was laying down the solos. He'd said 'Be quiet, big boys don't cry' — heaven knows why, but I soloed it and we all agreed that the idea sounded very interesting if we could just find the right voice to speak the words. Just at that point the door to the control room opened and our secretary Cathy Redfern looked in and whispered 'Eric, sorry to bother you. There's a telephone call for you.' Lol jumped up and said 'That's the voice, her voice is perfect!'." The group agreed that Redfern was the ideal person, but Redfern was unconvinced and had to be coaxed into recording her vocal contribution, using the same whispered voice that she had used when entering the control room. These whispered lyrics would inspire the name of the 1980s band Boys Don't Cry.

== Release and promotion ==
According to Stewart, at the time of recording The Original Soundtrack the band was already being courted by Mercury Records (part of the Phonogram group) to leave Jonathan King's small UK Records label, where they were struggling financially. He said: "I rang them. I said come and have a listen to what we've done, come and have a listen to this track. And they came up and they freaked, and they said, 'This is a masterpiece. How much money, what do you want? What sort of a contract do you want? We'll do anything.' On the strength of that one song, we did a five-year deal with them for five albums and they paid us a serious amount of money." Despite impressing their new label with the track, Phonogram felt that it was not suitable for release as a single due to its length, and released "Life Is a Minestrone" as the first single from The Original Soundtrack instead. However, many influential figures in the music industry were demanding that "I'm Not in Love" be released as a single, and Mercury eventually bowed to the pressure and released it as the second single from the album. The band were forced to edit the track down to four minutes for radio play, but once it charted, pressure from the public and the media caused the radio stations to revert to playing the full version.

Released in May 1975, "I'm Not in Love" became the band's second number one, staying atop the UK singles chart for two weeks from 28 June. In the US, the record peaked at number two on the Billboard Hot 100 for three weeks. In the UK the single was released in its full-length version of over six minutes; in the US and Canada it was released in an edited 3:42 version, and with a different B-side.

== Critical reception ==
The song received widespread praise from the UK music press. Andrew Tyler of the NME stated, "The Original Soundtrack contains ... just one wonderful track. And this is it." He went on to say that "it soars, it tickles, it leaves swellings on the forearms just below the elbows", and that "it's 10cc doing their instinctive best to root out the kind of rolling, well-modulated moodiness they could have been turning out all along". In Melody Maker, Colin Irwin called the record "outstandingly beautiful" and said, "it's such a perfectly constructed work that the song itself should quickly gain standard status in fields beyond rock". Sue Byrom of Record Mirror wrote, "Slow and lush, with beautifully building choruses, it's evocative of all things nice."

In the U.S., Record World said that "One of the most technically perfect productions of this or any year is kind of a cross between 2001 and the golden era Lennon-McCartney ballad days."

== Legacy ==
"I'm Not in Love" has enjoyed lasting popularity, with over three million plays on US radio since its release, and it won three Ivor Novello Awards in 1976 for Best Pop Song, International Hit of the Year, and Most Performed British Work. It has appeared in numerous films and television shows, including That '70s Show, The Virgin Suicides, Deuce Bigalow: Male Gigolo, SKAM, Guardians of the Galaxy, and Bridget Jones: The Edge of Reason. The song also appears in the 2006 video game Grand Theft Auto: Vice City Stories on the in-game radio station Emotion 98.3. The song was covered by Richie Havens, which appeared on his 1976 album The End of the Beginning. A cover by the Pretenders was specifically recorded for the soundtrack of the 1993 movie Indecent Proposal. Queen Latifah recorded a cover on her album Trav'lin' Light, and a cover version by Kelsey Lu was featured in the TV series Euphoria. Doja Cat sampled the song on "Shutcho", a song from her 2023 album, Scarlet.

== Personnel ==
Adapted from the liner notes of The Original Soundtrack.

- Eric Stewart – lead vocal, electric piano
- Graham Gouldman – guitar, bass guitar, backing vocals
- Kevin Godley – Moog, backing vocals
- Lol Creme – piano, backing vocals
- Cathy Redfern – uncredited whisper

== Charts ==
=== Weekly charts ===
Chart (1975)	Peak position
Australia (Kent Music Report)	3
Belgium (Ultratop 50 Flanders)	5
Belgium (Ultratop 50 Wallonia)	4
Canada Top Singles (RPM)	1
Canada Adult Contemporary (RPM)	4
Ireland (IRMA)	1
Italy (Musica e dischi)	24
Netherlands (Dutch Top 40)	5
Netherlands (Single Top 100)	5
New Zealand (Recorded Music NZ)	4
Norway (VG-lista)	6
South Africa (Springbok)	17
Spain (Promusicae)	12
Switzerland (Schweizer Hitparade)	8
UK Singles (Official Charts)	1
US Billboard Hot 100	2
US Adult Contemporary (Billboard)	10
US Cash Box Top 100	3
West Germany (GfK)	8

=== Year-end charts ===
Chart (1975)	Rank
Australia (Kent Music Report)	34
Belgium (Ultratop 50 Flanders)	38
Brazil (Brazilian Radio Airplay)	3
Canada Top Singles (RPM)	6
Netherlands (Dutch Top 40)	45
Netherlands (Single Top 100)	57
New Zealand (RIANZ)	30
UK Singles (OCC)	11
US Billboard Hot 100	43
US Cash Box Top 100	24

== Certifications and sales ==
Region	Certification	Certified units/sales
Denmark (IFPI Danmark)	Gold	45,000^{‡}
New Zealand (RMNZ)	2× Platinum	60,000^{‡}
United Kingdom (BPI)	Gold	400,000^{‡}
^{‡} Sales+streaming figures based on certification alone.

== Will to Power version ==
"I'm Not in Love"

Single by Will to Power

from the album Journey Home
- B-side: "Fly Bird"; "It's My Life"
- Released: June 11, 1990
- Genre: Pop; ballad; adult contemporary
- Length: 3:48
- Label: Epic
- Songwriters: Eric Stewart; Graham Gouldman

Will to Power singles chronology
"Fading Away" (1989)	"I'm Not in Love" (1990)	"Boogie Nights" (1990)

American musical group Will to Power covered the song for their second studio album, Journey Home (1990), releasing as the lead single from the album on June 11, 1990. Released by Epic Records, it reached the top ten on the pop charts of the US, Canada, Norway, and Portugal.

=== Track listing ===
No.	Title	Length
1.	"I'm Not in Love"	3:48
2.	"Fly Bird" (Reprise)	3:46
3.	"It's My Life"	5:23

=== Charts ===
==== Weekly charts ====
Chart (1990–1991)	Peak position
Australia (ARIA)	38
Canada Top Singles (RPM)	7
Canada Adult Contemporary (RPM)	3
Europe (Eurochart Hot 100)	78
Europe (European Hit Radio)	4
Germany (GfK)	48
Ireland (IRMA)	27
New Zealand (Recorded Music NZ)	15
Norway (VG-lista)	8
Portugal (AFP)	6
UK Singles (Official Charts)	29
US Billboard Hot 100	7
US Adult Contemporary (Billboard)	4
US Cash Box Top 100	7

==== Year-end charts ====
Chart (1991)	Position
Canada Top Singles (RPM)	54
Canada Adult Contemporary (RPM)	50
Europe (European Hit Radio)	50
US Billboard Hot 100	83
US Adult Contemporary (Billboard)	37

=== Release history ===
Region	Date	Format(s)	Label(s)	Ref.
United States	29 June 1990	—N/a	Epic	
United Kingdom	10 December 1990	7-inch vinyl; CD; cassette	Epic	
United Kingdom	14 January 1991	12-inch vinyl	Epic	
Australia	14 January 1991	7-inch vinyl; CD; cassette	Epic	

== 10cc acoustic version ==
"I'm Not in Love"

Single by 10cc

from the album Mirror Mirror
- B-side: "Blue Bird"
- Released: 1995
- Length: 3:30
- Label: Avex UK
- Songwriters: Eric Stewart; Graham Gouldman
- Producers: 10cc, Rod Gammons

10cc singles chronology
"Ready to Go Home" (1995)	"I'm Not in Love" (1995)

In 1995, Eric Stewart and Graham Gouldman re-recorded "I'm Not in Love" as an acoustic version for the last 10cc studio album Mirror Mirror. It was released as a single and charted at number 29 in the UK, giving the band their biggest hit since "Dreadlock Holiday" in 1978.

=== Track listing ===
1. "I'm Not in Love (Acoustic Session '95)" - 3:30
2. "I'm Not in Love (Rework of Art Mix)" - 5:51
3. "Blue Bird" (Graham Gouldman) - 4:04

== Deni Hines version ==
"I'm Not in Love"

Single by Deni Hines

from the album Imagination
- Released: 1996
- Length: 6:02
- Label: Festival Mushroom Records
- Songwriters: Eric Stewart; Graham Gouldman
- Producer: Ian Green

Deni Hines singles chronology
"I Like the Way" (1996)	"I'm Not in Love" (1996)	"Joy" (1997)

In 1996, Australian singer Deni Hines released "I'm Not in Love" as the fourth single from her debut album Imagination (1996). At the ARIA Music Awards of 1997, "I'm Not in Love" was nominated for two awards - ARIA Award for Best Female Artist losing to "Mary" by Monique Brumby and the ARIA Award for Best Pop Release losing to "To the Moon and Back" by Savage Garden.

=== Track listing ===
1. "I'm Not in Love"
2. "It's Alright" (quiet summertime version)
3. "Joy" (full testament mix)
4. "It's Alright" (summertime remix)

== Olive version ==
"I'm Not in Love"

Single by Olive

from the album Trickle
- Released: 27 June 2000
- Recorded: 1999
- Genre: Trip hop
- Length: 4:39
- Label: Maverick
- Songwriters: Eric Stewart; Graham Gouldman

Olive singles chronology
"Outlaw" (1997)	"I'm Not in Love" (2000)	"Tell Me" (2003)

Following their debut album, the English trip hop band Olive recorded a cover of the song. At the cusp of their new record contract with Maverick Records at the time, the band debuted the song on the label's soundtrack for the Madonna film The Next Best Thing before releasing it as the debut single from their second album, Trickle.

Fronted by the lone vocals of singer Ruth-Ann Boyle, the song simulated the backing tracks of the original; the most audible modification made to the song is a percussion track in the style of drum and bass, turning the song into an upbeat dance track.

Accompanied by dance-oriented remixes on the single release, the song gained sufficient nightclub play to reach number one on the Billboard Hot Dance Music/Club Play chart (on the week of 1 July 2000), as well as airplay on dance-hits format radio.
