= Journey Home (album) =

Studio album by Will to Power
- Released: 1990
- Studio: Studio Center (North Miami, Florida); Criteria Studios and Midland Studios (Miami, Florida); Tom's Million Dollah Joint
- Genre: Dance-pop, freestyle, adult contemporary
- Label: Epic
- Producer: Bob Rosenberg

Will to Power chronology
Will to Power (1988)	Journey Home (1990)	Spirit Warrior (2005)

Professional ratings
Review scores
Source	Rating
Q	2/5 stars

Journey Home is the second studio album from Will to Power, released in 1990 by the label Epic Records. The album peaked at No. 178 on the Billboard 200 in the United States.

Three singles were released from the album. The first, "I'm Not in Love" (a cover of the 10cc song) reached the top 10 on the Billboard Hot 100. The second, "Boogie Nights" (a cover of the Heatwave song) failed to chart. The final single, "Fly Bird", was released only in the Netherlands, where it reached No. 60 on the MegaCharts. Q characterised it as "plodding power balladry".

== Track listing ==
All songs written by Bob Rosenberg except Tracks #7 & 8.

No.	Title	Length
1.	"Journey Home"	4:09
2.	"Don't Like It"	4:36
3.	"Fly Bird"	5:51
4.	"Best Friend's Girl"	3:53
5.	"Clock on the Wall"	5:02
6.	"Koyaanisqatsi"	6:08
7.	"Boogie Nights"	3:40
8.	"I'm Not in Love"	3:48
9.	"It's My Life"	5:23
10.	"Fly Bird" (Reprise)	3:45

== Personnel ==
Will to Power

- Elin Michaels – lead vocals, backing vocals
- Bob Rosenberg – lead vocals

Musicians and Vocalists

- Lester Mendez – keyboards, keyboard programming, drum programming
- Steve Roitstein – additional programming
- Gary King – guitars
- Orlando Hernández – live drums
- Luis Santiago – percussion
- Ed Calle – horn section, lead saxophone
- Dana Teboe – horn section
- Tony Concepcion – horn section
- Ken Faulk – horn section
- Donna Allen – backing vocals
- Harry King – backing vocals
- Jamie Marks – backing vocals
- Wendy Pederson – backing vocals
- Kirsten Steinhauer – backing vocals
- Dee Dee Wilde – backing vocals

=== Production ===
- Michael Caplan – executive producer
- Bob Rosenberg – producer, mixing
- David Abraham – mix engineer
- Cesar Sogbe – engineer, mix engineer
- Tommy Afont – assistant engineer
- Mike Couzzi – additional engineer
- John Hagg – additional engineer
- Carlos Santos – additional engineer
- Lester Mendez – mixing, production assistant
- Elin Michaels – mixing, production assistant
- Frolian Sosa – mixing, production assistant
- David Coleman – art direction
- Peter Greco – logo design concept
- Bret Lopez – photography
- Andrea Levinson – stylist
- Carter Bradley – make-up

== Charts ==
Chart (1991)	Peak position
Australian Albums (ARIA)	119
US Billboard 200	178
