= Will to Power (band) =

American dance-pop group

- Origin: Miami, Florida, United States
- Genres: Dance-pop
- Years active: 1987–present
- Labels: Epic (1987–1991); Straight Blast (2004–present)
- Members: Bob Rosenberg; Elin Michaels
- Past members: Rachel Newman; April Newman; Ale Lorenzo; Donna Allen; Wendy Pederson; Suzi Carr; Maria Mendez; Lori Miller

Will to Power is an American dance-pop group that originated in South Florida in the mid-1980s, founded by Miami producer Bob Rosenberg. The group recorded a number of hit singles on the Billboard dance and pop charts in the late 1980s and early 1990s, most notably "Baby, I Love Your Way/Freebird Medley", a medley of 1970s hits by Peter Frampton and Lynyrd Skynyrd that reached the top of the Billboard Hot 100 in December 1988. A second hit was "I'm Not in Love", a cover of 10cc's 1975 hit: number 7 on Billboard Hot 100 in 1990.

The group has also two number one singles on Billboard Hot Dance Club Play: "Say It's Gonna Rain" and "Fading Away", and continues to create music into the 21st century and are currently performing live (Bob Rosenberg and Elin Michaels).

== Biography ==
=== The early years ===
Bob Rosenberg was born in Philadelphia, Pennsylvania. His mother, Gloria Mann, was a pop singer who had two Top 40 pop hits in the mid-1950s on the Sound Records label, "Earth Angel (Will You Be Mine)" and "Teen Age Prayer". After attending school in Florida, Rosenberg became a DJ at various local events, and by 1985 he was working at a Miami CHR radio station, WHQT (Hot 105). He remixed and edited songs as a radio-mix DJ for the station, and these mixes became popular in the Miami area. Rosenberg created a rap record in 1985 that was titled "Miami Vice", based on the popular TV show and its theme song, but MCA Records claimed that Rosenberg had infringed on their copyright. He also remixed and edited the song "Beat Box" for 2 Live Crew's 1986 debut album, The 2 Live Crew Is What We Are.

During 1986 and 1987, Rosenberg worked with various other musicians to create original music. He chose the name Will to Power for the group as an homage to German philosopher Friedrich Nietzsche's theory of an individual's fundamental Will to Power.

1986 to 1988: Rosenberg wrote "Dreamin'" as a tribute to his sister, Robin, after she had died. Radio program director Bill Tanner was the first PD to play "Dreamin" on Power 96 in Miami, Florida. Released in Miami on the Thrust Records label, "Dreamin'" became a regional hit and got the attention of Epic Records, who picked up the song for distribution to radio stations and dance clubs around the country. The song peaked at No. 50 on the Billboard Hot 100 chart and at No. 15 on the Billboard Hot Dance Club Play chart in August 1987. It also reached No. 1 on the Billboard Hot Dance Music/Maxi-Singles Sales chart in September of that year. Epic Records asked Rosenberg if he had enough material for an album. In June 1988, Will to Power released a follow-up single, "Say It's Gonna Rain", This song reached No. 49 on the Billboard Hot 100 chart in July 1988 and spent two weeks atop the Billboard Hot Dance Club Play chart in August and September of that year.

In the Spring of 1987, after "Dreamin'" was released on Rosenberg’s label Thrust records, CBS/Epic and other labels took note of it. The single became an instant hit. Bob Rosenberg was exclusively offered a record deal, and was signed with CBS/Epic Records in April 1987. Although he was signed with just a single, Rosenberg along with his then girlfriend, and lead vocalists on the song "Dreamin’", Suzi Carr, and her friend, saxophonist Dr. J, began touring and performing back-to-back at different shows nationwide.

Rosenberg’s contract included the opportunity to record various albums. Rosenberg began the planning and spent much of 1987 and early 1988 working on new material with a variety of different session vocalists, (Carr, Newman, Lorenzo, and others) with Carr on all the lead vocals of the #1 hits, and musicians including (keyboardists Lawrence Dermer, Lester Mendez and David Rosenthal). Will to Power’s self-titled debut album, was released on Epic Records in March 1988. Along with the aforementioned songs "Dreamin'" and "Say It's Gonna Rain", the album contained a medley of two popular rock songs from the 1970s, "Baby, I Love Your Way" with Carr again on lead vocals (a 1976 hit record for Peter Frampton) and "Free Bird" (a well-known track by the Southern rock band Lynyrd Skynyrd from 1973). This medley was titled "Baby I Love Your Way/Freebird Medley (Free Baby)". Although Epic was reluctant to release this hybrid song as a single, Rosenberg had distributed copies of the song to various radio stations in the Miami vicinity, including WPOW (Power 96). According to Rosenberg, "they played it, and a few other stations caught onto it, so Epic put it out." This song became the group's biggest hit, spending a week at No. 1 on the Billboard Hot 100 and reaching No. 2 on the Billboard adult contemporary chart in December 1988. It also became the group's highest-charting hit in the UK, reaching No. 6 on the UK Singles Chart. That month, the album reached its peak position of No. 68 on the Billboard 200 albums chart. A fourth single from the album, "Fading Away", which spent two weeks atop the Billboard Hot Dance Club Play chart in early 1989.

=== 1989 to 1991: Journey Home ===
After the success of the debut album, Will to Power's follow-up album, Journey Home, was released in late 1990. Rosenberg continued with the group, producing the album, recording vocals and writing most of the songs. The primary female vocalist was then Elin Michaels, a dance-pop singer who sang all of the background vocals (along with Rosenberg's cousin, Rachel Newman, and former Expose singer, Ale Lorenzo), on all of the songs for the first album. Elin, Rachel, and Ale’s background voices are prominent in both, " Say It's Gonna Rain and "Fading Away". Singer Elin Michaels had respectively released some 12" singles on the Knockout Records label in the mid-1980s. Additional musicians who worked on the album include Donna Allen, Dee Dee Wilde, Wendy Pederson and Harry King on additional vocals, Ed Calle and Tony Concepción on horns, Orlando Hernandez on drums and Lester Mendez on keyboards. The album appeared on the Billboard 200 albums chart in February 1991, peaking at #178.

The first single to be released from the album was "I'm Not in Love", a cover version of a song by the British art rock band 10cc that was a No. 1 UK and No. 2 US pop hit in 1975. Will to Power's version made the top ten on the Billboard Hot 100, peaking at No. 7 in January 1991 in addition to reaching No. 4 on the Billboard adult contemporary chart. The song reached No. 29 in the UK singles chart. The follow-up single was a cover of the disco hit "Boogie Nights" by the band Heatwave, however this version failed to chart. Other songs on the album include "Fly Bird" and "Clock on the Wall".

=== 1992 to present ===
In 1996, Sony Music Entertainment (the parent company of Epic Records) released a Will to Power compilation album, Love Power, on their Sony Special Products label. It consists of songs that had appeared on the group's first two albums, including their two US pop top ten songs, "Baby, I Love Your Way/Freebird Medley" and "I'm Not in Love".

The group released a new album, Spirit Warrior, in 2004 on Straight Blast Records, which was followed by an EP in 2006 titled Spirit Warrior: The Remixes. For this album, Rosenberg collaborated with vocalists such as Gioia Bruno (member of the freestyle music group Exposé), Donna Allen and Wendy Pederson, and remixers such as Giuseppe D and the Wonder Twins.

== Critical reception ==
Allmusic's retrospective reviews of the group's first two albums are generally positive, with Will to Power receiving four stars out of a possible five and Journey Home receiving three stars. Entertainment Weekly gave Journey Home a D+ rating in a February 1991 review by Bill Wyman, stating that "the material is predominantly colorless pop songs". However, music journalist Chuck Eddy mentions tracks from Journey Home in his 1997 book, The Accidental Evolution of Rock 'n' Roll: A Misguided Tour Through Popular Music. In the section titled "Automotive Rock", Eddy mentions that the song "Journey Home" is the title track of what may have been his favorite album of the 1990s, that it is seemingly based on the 1981 song "Cruising with the Deuce" by Quarterflash and that Rosenberg "says he's got to keep his motor running, but not only can you feel the machine's momentum (in the rhythm), you can also feel stormclouds settling in (in the voices)."

== Discography ==
=== Studio albums ===
- Will to Power (1988)
- Journey Home (1990)
- Spirit Warrior (2004)

== See also ==
- List of artists who reached number one in the United States
- List of artists who reached number one on the U.S. dance chart
