= Say It's Gonna Rain =

Single by Will to Power

from the album Will to Power
- Released: 1988
- Recorded: 1987
- Genre: Freestyle
- Length: 3:53 (album version); 6:36 (12" version)
- Label: Epic
- Songwriter: Bob Rosenberg
- Producer: Bob Rosenberg

Will to Power singles chronology
"Dreamin'" (1988)	"Say It's Gonna Rain" (1988)	""Baby, I Love Your Way/Freebird Medley"" (1988)

"Say It's Gonna Rain" is a song by American dance-pop group Will to Power. The original version of the song appeared on their 1988 self-titled debut album. The lead vocals on the track were sung by singer-songwriter Suzi Carr. A 12" single was released to clubs in 1988, and this remix became the first of two number-one songs for the band on the American dance chart. The song spent two weeks at number-one on this chart in August and September 1988. The song also peaked at number 49 on the Billboard Hot 100 chart in July 1988.

== Track listing ==
US 12" single #1

No.	Title	Length
1.	"Say It's Gonna Rain" (Extended Mix)	6:36
2.	"Say It's Gonna Rain" (Instrumental Mix)	5:24
3.	"Say It's Gonna Rain" (808 Capella)	2:00

US 12" Single #2

No.	Title	Length
1.	"Say It's Gonna Rain" (Popstand Remix)	8:36
2.	"Say It's Gonna Rain" (Acid Rain Dub)	6:39
3.	"Say It's Gonna Rain" (Popstand Nueva York Remix)	7:26
4.	"Say It's Gonna Rain" (Orange Sunshine Dub)	6:36

== Charts ==
Chart (1988)	Peak position
Canada RPM Dance	8
US Billboard Hot 100	49
US Hot Dance Music/Club Play	1
US Hot Dance Music/Maxi-Singles Sales	3

== See also ==
- List of number-one dance singles of 1988 (U.S.)
