= Tim Kellett =

English musician (born 1964)

- Born: 23 July 1964 (age 62)
- Origin: Knaresborough, Yorkshire, England
- Instruments: Vocals; guitars
- Years active: 1984–present

Tim Kellett (born 23 July 1964 in Knaresborough, Yorkshire, England) is an English musician, songwriter and record producer.

== Biography ==
Kellett has worked in the British music industry for the past twenty eight years. His professional career began in 1984, when he joined the British post-punk band the Durutti Column as trumpeter, but he left in 1985 to join Simply Red where he also played keyboards and performed backing vocals live. According to MTV he joined Simply Red earlier in 1981. They had a No.2 UK / No.1 US hit in 1986 with "Holding Back The Years". Kellett left the band in 1991. In 1994, Kellett formed Olive with Robin Taylor-Firth, also of Nightmares on Wax. Olive had a No.1 UK hit in May 1997 with "You're Not Alone" before going on hiatus in 2001.

Kellett also had success in writing songs for the Lighthouse Family and, more recently, James Morrison and Matthew Ward. Other collaborations include Nate James, Ella Chi, Emma Bunton, Gareth Gates, Girls Aloud, Christophe William and Taio Cruz. The latter wrote and produced with Kellett on the track "Never Gonna Get Us" for Cruz's 2008 Departure album.

== Discography ==
=== The Durutti Column ===
- Without Mercy (1984)
- Circuses and Bread (1986)

=== Simply Red ===
- Picture Book (1985)
- Men And Women (1987)
- A New Flame (1989)
- Stars (1991)

=== Olive ===
- Extra Virgin (1996)
- Trickle (2000)

=== James Morrison ===
- "This Boy" (2007) from his debut album, Undiscovered
- "One Last Chance" (2007) also from Undiscovered
