= Robin Taylor-Firth =

English musician

Robin Taylor-Firth is an English musician notable for performance, songwriting and production on various projects including Nightmares on Wax, Olive, Backyard Dog, and BudNubac.

His recording career began in the early 1990s with a series of twelve-inch singles pressed by Dislocated Hip Records, under the artistic name 'On'. Picked up in 1993 by Warp Records' sub-label, Nucleus, Taylor-Firth began a relationship with Sheffield-based Warp Records which continues via his membership of Nightmares on Wax to the present day. Though less present in Nightmares on Wax of late, he was a major part of the earlier works, such as Smoker's Delight, Car Boot Soul and Mind Elevation, co producing and co-writing many of the themes. His individual keyboard style is also heavily represented.

"You're Not Alone", which he co-wrote with Tim Kellett and recorded with the band Olive reached number one in the UK Singles Chart in 1997. Backyard Dog were also notable for the commercial success of the song "Baddest Ruffest", which featured on the soundtrack of Ali G Indahouse, and also in Coca-Cola's 2002 World Cup UK advertising campaign. Taylor-Firth currently resides in Madrid, Spain and is listed as a director of the music recording and publishing company BlancoMusic.

He won the Ivor Novello Award for Best Dance Music in 1997 for "You're Not Alone".

In 2014, he signed a major new publishing deal with Sony ATV.
