= Enigma videography =

Band videography

This is a list of music videos by the German musical project Enigma.

== MCMXC a.D. ==
Song title	Personnel	External links
"Sadeness (Part I)"	Director: Michel Guimbard; Producer: Thierry Sadoun	
A man is writing at a desk with a quill pen when he falls asleep. He then descends into a dream where he wears a red cloak, and explores the ruins of an old cathedral. During his exploration, the screen fades in and out from the cathedral into one of a woman. One of the most striking objects in the cathedral is a vivid rose, contrasting the decay of his surroundings. He is then brought back into the cathedral and tries to run away after opening a door that leads to darkness. He then disappears into the ground and the cloak left behind floats into the darkness, and he wakes up from his dream abruptly.
"Principles of Lust"	Director: Howard Greenhalgh; Producer: Megan Hollister/Pam James	
The scene shows an orgy of sorts, with a large group of adult males and females engaging in lascivious behavior with each other. The setting is in a non-descript room with a heavy red color setting, with heavy accents of rose and nude tones as well. The characters wear what appears to be lingerie from the Victorian era, as well as European-style wigs and accessory jewelry. For the length of the song, only soft-core sexual acts being performed, with nothing overtly obscene being displayed. British model Laura Berkley is the main female character in the video.
"Mea Culpa (Part II)"	Director: Howard Greenhalgh; Producer: Pam James	
The video for uses the "Orthodox Mix" of the song instead of the album version and is usually credited as "Mea Culpa Part II". Most of the video is cast in a sepia tone and features an endless plume of smoke superimposed over the images. The video begins and ends with a kneeling woman swaying as if in prayer, with close-ups revealing that she wears a pair of heavy gauntlets. In-between are scenes of a young woman either running through an expansive cathedral's courtyard or being carted away in a rickety wagon as if to a witch trial. In a highly unusual move for Enigma videos, the band's name is featured prominently in several scenes alongside what appears to be an alchemical symbol.
"The Rivers of Belief"	Director: Howard Greenhalgh; Producer: Megan Hollister	
The two settings for the music video are medieval Europe and rural India. It starts off with a few crusade-like images, and proceeds to showing clips of an Indian boy jumping into, and running in, a yellow river. The rest of the video interleaves those two settings, along with some clips of the singer, Michael Cretu.

== The Cross of Changes ==
Song title	Personnel	External links
"Return to Innocence"	Director: Julien Temple	
The music video begins in black and white with an old man tending to a fruit farm. He plucks a quince from a tree and bites into it before lying down on the grass, dying. The fallen fruits surrounding him then rises back up into the tree as the video switches to colour. Then his life is shown in reverse, working and living in the countryside together with his wife. The video progresses backwards showing the couple's church wedding, their lovemaking in the farmhouse and the time when they both were young adults. The video then shows the wife as a young girl just learning to write and the man as a young boy, biting into a fruit. The music video ends with the boy being baptised as a baby. During the length of the video, a white unicorn, representing innocence and purity, appears several times as it gallops in reverse. The music video was shot in Málaga, Spain,
"Age of Loneliness"	Director: Big TV!	
The video contains many clips from central New York and daily New York life. Both urban and suburban parts of the town are shown. Most of these clips also have people of different ages, races and gender floating and swimming mid-air. Some of them are shown wet and naked, seemingly invisible to the surrounding New Yorkers. The video has no apparent story, instead relying on the surreal images to capture the viewer. At the very end of the video clip, a taxi passes by a cinema which has a signboard that says "Almost Full Moon". That is a probable but unconfirmed reference to a song with the same title on the next Enigma album, released in 1996.
"The Eyes of Truth"	Director: Julien Temple	
The video is set in a rural part of Nepal. It begins by observing beekeepers at work but quickly turns to a woman placing her baby in a reed basket and floating it down a river. The baby is eventually found by elephants and raised by them. A few years later, the child begins a journey with the elephant, passing through mountains and forests before reaching a village where he is welcomed by exuberant crowds as a messianic figure.
"Out from the Deep"	Director: Ángel Gracia	
In the music video, a diver wearing a standard diving dress explores an ancient sunken city by flashlight while fishes swim throughout the city. He comes upon a big door, opens it and is engulfed in a bright light. In the next scene the diver awakes and finds himself in a room with Roman-era frescoes. The people in the frescoes comes alive as the city cracks and crumbles with the diver in it. In the last scene, the diver has himself been turned into a fresco on a chunk of the city wall.

== Le Roi Est Mort, Vive Le Roi! ==
Song title	Personnel	External links
"Beyond the Invisible"	Director: Julien Temple	
In the music video, a girl escapes from an unhappy home and into a forest where forest nymphs reside. There she sees a couple figure skating in the middle of the forest and hides in the bushes to watch them secretly. At the end, she is spotted by one of the "man-machines" and leaves together with them as they and the other two "man-machines" fade and disappear. The skaters are Finnish European Figure Skating Championship winners, Susanna Rahkamo and Petri Kokko. The music video is influenced by Michael Cretu's vision of ice skating, forest nymphs, and "man-machines" (the latter of which also adorn the album cover).
"T.N.T. for the Brain"	Director: Anthea Benton	
The video follows the dreams of a handsome young man dressed in a style reminiscent of Victorian fashion. The man finds himself before several doorways, behind each lies a different woman. The first is a woman dressed in a similarly Victorian style with an elaborate mask tattooed onto her face. She moves unnaturally and wears menacing silver jewelry on her hands. The second woman is dressed simply but wears a pink wicker mask. The third rests in a spiderweb. The final women he meets are a pair of heavily made-up twins. Between these scenes is featured a mysterious man dressed in what appears to be a matador's outfit.

== The Screen Behind the Mirror ==
Song title	Personnel	External links
"Gravity of Love"	Director: Thomas Job	
In the video a high society masquerade ball is being held at a huge mansion. Even the wait staff wear black masks. Early on in the video, we are granted a glimpse of the party going on "behind the mirror", where the guests wear significantly less and a host of unusual characters hold sway, including a strange woman dressed in white and attended by young girls and a severe dominatrix-like woman offering Eucharist in an eroticized priest's outfit. As the video progresses, the guests behind the mirror give in more and more to lust and hedonism, while the strange woman convulses as if giving birth. At the climax of the song, things suddenly change and the party behind the mirror beings to die down. The guests in the real world run from the mansion, leaving only the wait staff and a final image of the strange woman standing naked as if reborn. The video is filmed in location in Vienna, Austria.
"Push the Limits"	Director: Thomas Job	
The video for features a young man and woman in three different but related storylines. The two approach a two-player arcade machine set in an open field. Both of them pick a character to represent in the game, which appears to resemble kendo. They are shown putting on their armor and preparing themselves in the game, the boy dressed in black and the woman in white. Meanwhile, a third set of images shows the man and woman simulating sex in a bed that sits in the same field as the video game cabinets, but both are wearing simple masks with sad expressions implying the simulated acts are not entirely consensual. As the video progresses and the two kendo fighters duel, the bed scenes become more intense. The man gains the upper hand in both scenes but the woman fights back until black fighter falls. The couple walks away from the machine and the boy kneels before the girl in defeat. In the video game storyline, the white fighter removes their mask and it is revealed that the man played the white fighter the entire time. The woman is now lifeless on the floor and her armour dissolves, so does her own body too, leaving behind flower petals in the silhouette of her body. The video is filmed in location in South Africa, and Brazilian model Milene Zardo plays as both the woman and the kendo fighter.

== Love Sensuality Devotion: The Greatest Hits ==
Song title	Personnel	External links
"Turn Around"	Director: Thomas Job	
The video is partly digitally animated, with the main vocals being sung by a semi-transparent animated head. The video has no strong theme and features many random clips from different settings from modern time (rocket takeoff, club dancing, middle-east stargazing). It has animated clips of dancers, some of them without clothes.

== Voyageur ==
The third single from the album, "Following the Sun", is the only Enigma single not to have a music video accompanied with it.

Song title	Personnel	External links
"Voyageur"	Director: Thomas Job	
In the video we follow a middle age woman on a night out. The woman moves in a very jerky way, and also influences anyone in her immediate vicinity to move the same way. She visits a restaurant, a nightclub and later a party. One of the stronger images in the video is where the woman goes past a crucifix, and turns around mimicking the way Jesus hangs on the cross. After proceeding to have a cuddle session with another woman visiting the party, she goes back home. Just outside her gate, she stops, takes out her earphones and starts moving normally.
"Boum-Boum"	Director: Charles Eames	
The song in the video is the "Chicane Club Version". It features yet again a young man and a very attractive lady in a modern city complete with shining skyscrapers. Both of them spend their time separate from each other during most of the day, and in the middle of the video they meet at a subway station. The two go shopping and sightseeing, as well as flirting with each other in a quiet building hallway. The video ends with both of them together in their apartment, holding each other's hands.

== 15 Years After ==
Song title	Personnel	External links
"Hello and Welcome"	Director: Thomas Job	
The video alternates between German boxer Felix Sturm's training, and clips of Sturm's battles with his opponents in the ring. With every punch that Sturm lands on his opponent, the screen turns into a tinted red. At the very end of the video, a white horse that looks similar to the unicorn from Return to Innocence appears for a brief instant.

== A Posteriori ==
The album was released in DVD form in December 2006, which features the entire album in 5.1 surround with only galactic images in kaleidoscope style and geometric patters.

== Seven Lives, Many Faces ==
Song title	Personnel	External links
"Seven Lives"
The video was largely based on clips taken from the previous music videos, such as Push the Limits and Mea Culpa.
"La Puerta del Cielo"
The video was largely based on clips taken from the previous music video, such as Age of Loneliness.

== MMX (The Social Song) ==
Song title	Personnel	External links
"MMX (The Social Song)"	Director: Aristides Moreno; Produced: Steadycamline	
Since the song itself is a collaboration by the fans themselves, the video was also made of clips submitted by fans all over the world. On January 24, 2011, an ultimate event for the single was announced on the official website and a video contest was set up. After a month of submissions and votes, Aristides Moreno (Steadycamline) was finally announced as the winner of the video contest and became its official director. The video shows many random people at random places all over the world lifting up their heads. Later, the woman, who resembles an angel figure, explodes a yellow ball, and people start floating in the midair. Throughout the video there is a blue light flying across the sky, which is usually interpreted as the idea of music or social connection.

== The Fall of a Rebel Angel ==
Song title	Personnel	External links
"Sadeness (Part II)"
The song features Anggun.
"Amen"
The song features Aquilo.

== Additional information ==
Label: Virgin Catalog#: 50999 227124 9 3 Format: DVD, DVD-Video, Album, PAL, Regionfree Country: Europe Released: 28 Nov 2008 Genre: Electronic, Pop, Rock, Stage & Screen Style: New Age, Abstract, Disco, Lo-Fi, Ambient

Artwork By - Dirk Rudolph Film Director [Director] - Thomas Job (2) Other Artist [Photos] - Rosemary Robenn, Vinod Kotiya Producer - Michael Cretu Written-By, Lyrics By - Andru Donalds (tracks: 8,9), Margarita Roig (tracks: 7,11), Michael Cretu (tracks: 1–13)

Comes in standard (black) DVD-case with insert. Contains audio comments by Michael Cretu (Germany/English)

Aspect ratio: 4:3 Audio formats: Stereo, DD5.1, DTS5.1 Running time: approximately 47:37

The aspect ratio is misprinted on the release because it is 16:9 with 4:3 picture.

All songs published by 1-2-3 Music / Crocodile Music. (P) 2008 The copyright in this audiovisual recording is owned by Baloo Music S.A. under exclusive licence to Virgin Music, a division of EMI Music Germany GmbH & Co. KG (C) 2008 EMI Music Germany GmbH & Co. KG

Made in the EU. Labelcode: LC 03098 Barcode: 5 099922 712493 Disc-Matrix: D851458-01 / 2271249
