= The Platinum Collection (Enigma album) =

Box set by Enigma
- Released: 23 November 2009
- Genres: Ambient; new-age
- Length: 180:07
- Label: Virgin / EMI
- Producer: Michael Cretu

Enigma chronology
Seven Lives Many Faces (2008)	The Platinum Collection (2009)	The Fall of a Rebel Angel (2016)

Professional ratings
Review scores
Source	Rating
AllMusic	3.5/5 stars

The Platinum Collection is a 2009 box set by the ambient musical project Enigma. It contains three CDs – the first CD comprises the band's most popular tracks from previous years, the second CD consists of remixes, and the third CD contains previously unreleased tracks composed and produced by Michael Cretu. The cover image shows the Lady with an Ermine (Cecilia Gallerani) as painted ca. 1489–1491 by Leonardo da Vinci.

== Track listing ==
The Greatest Hits – disc one
No.	Title	Length
1.	"Sadeness (Part I)"	4:20
2.	"Mea Culpa" (Orthodox Version)	4:01
3.	"Principles of Lust"	3:26
4.	"The Rivers of Belief"	4:23
5.	"Return to Innocence"	4:11
6.	"Age of Loneliness"	4:16
7.	"Out from the Deep"	4:32
8.	"Beyond the Invisible"	4:35
9.	"T.N.T. for the Brain"	4:03
10.	"Gravity of Love"	4:00
11.	"Push the Limits"	3:54
12.	"Voyageur"	3:57
13.	"Turn Around"	3:55
14.	"Boum-Boum"	3:43
15.	"Following the Sun"	4:18
16.	"Seven Lives"	3:47
17.	"La Puerta del Cielo"	3:33
Total length:		1:08:54

The Remix Collection – disc two
No.	Title	Length
1.	"Sadeness (U.S. Violent Mix)"	5:05
2.	"Mea Culpa (Fading Shades Mix)"	6:16
3.	"Principles of Lust (Everlasting Lust Mix)"	5:09
4.	"Return to Innocence (Long & Alive Version)"	7:07
5.	"Age of Loneliness (Enigmatic Club Mix)"	6:22
6.	"Out from the Deep (Trance Mix)"	5:50
7.	"T.N.T. for the Brain (Midnight Man Mix)"	5:57
8.	"Gravity of Love (Judgement Day Club Mix)"	6:13
9.	"Push the Limits (ATB Remix)"	8:31
10.	"Voyageur (Club Mix)"	6:25
11.	"Boum-Boum (Chicane Club Edit)"	5:03
12.	"Dreaming of Andromeda (Jean F. Cochois Remix)"	7:29
Total length:		1:15:27

The Lost Ones – disc three
No.	Title	Length
1.	"Lost One"	3:39
2.	"Lost Two"	2:13
3.	"Lost Three"	3:34
4.	"Lost Four"	3:28
5.	"Lost Five"	2:31
6.	"Lost Six"	2:17
7.	"Lost Seven"	4:12
8.	"Lost Eight"	3:59
9.	"Lost Nine"	3:23
10.	"Lost Ten"	2:40
11.	"Lost Eleven"	3:50
Total length:		35:46

== Charts ==
Chart performance for The Platinum Collection
Chart (2010)	Peak position
US Top Dance/Electronic Albums (Billboard)	18
