= Sajāja Bramaņi =

Latvian folk tune

"Sajāja Bramaņi" ("Nobleman Rode Together") is a Latvian folk tune.

"Sajāja Bramaņi" performed by the folk ensemble Rasa was sampled and used in Enigma's 1996 song "Beyond the Invisible" included on the album Le Roi Est Mort, Vive Le Roi!.
