= Hsu Tsang-Houei =

Taiwanese ethnomusicologist (1929–2001)

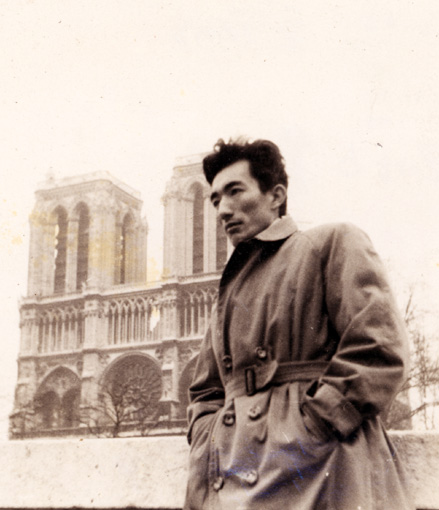
- Born: 6 September 1929; Taichū Prefecture
- Died: 1 January 2001
- Education: National Taiwan Normal University
- Occupations: Composer, ethnomusicologist
- Awards: Chevalier des Arts et des Lettres

Hsu Tsang-Houei (Chinese: 許常惠; pinyin: Xǔ Chánghuì; Pe̍h-ōe-jī: Khó͘ Siông-hūi; September 6, 1929 – January 1, 2001) was a Taiwanese musician and music educator. As an ethnomusicologist, he has been called a "pioneering collector of Taiwanese folk songs" by the Taiwan Ministry of Culture.

== Early life and education ==
Hsu was born in Hemei Village, Changhua County, Taichung, Taiwan, in the period of Japanese occupation, and went to Japan to study at the age of 12, majoring in violin. He came back to Taiwan and studied at Taiwan Provincial Normal College (now National Taiwan Normal University) department of music, serving as a violinist at Taiwan Provincial Symphony Orchestra (now National Taiwan Symphony Orchestra) after graduating.

Hsu went to Europe and studied violin with Colette de Lioucount, then to France to study at the University of Paris, majoring in composition and studying under André Jolivet. In 1959, he chose the poem "Yesterday Someone Came from the Sea" and composed it into a soprano solo piece, which was selected for the competition of the Italian Modern Music Society, and then began his composing career.

== Career ==
Besides music composing, he also collected local music cultural works, for example, Taiwanese folk songs. Furthermore, Hsu used Western compositional methods to rewrite traditional Chinese music, such as the cantata "Song of Burial Flowers" based on A Dream of Red Mansions; as well as the opera from The Legend of the White Snake, and the "Baijiachun Concerto", which were well-known and well received. Hsu was influenced by Béla Bartók's use of folk music, as well as Antonín Dvořák's embrace of nationalism.

In addition to composing music, Hsu formed many modern music groups, and devoted himself to the education of modern music and the preservation of folk music. He was a co-founder of the Asian Composers League which now confers theTsang-Houei Hsu Memorial Prize (許常惠紀念獎) in his memory.

Hsu taught multiple generations of students in the field of Taiwanese folk music and introduced the indigenous music of Taiwan to an international audience. In 1988, he took a group of indigenous artists on a tour of European countries including France, Switzerland, Germany and the Netherlands. Among the performers were Amis husband and wife duo Difang and Igay Duana, whose vocal performance were famously recorded and used without their permission as a centerpiece of the popular song "Return to Innocence" by the new age band Enigma. They would later settle with Enigma for an undisclosed amount of money.

In 1992, he founded the Journal of Music Research at National Taiwan Normal University's College of Music.
