= Songs from the Victorious City =

Studio album by Anne Dudley & Jaz Coleman
- Released: 1990
- Genre: Arabic music; World music
- Length: 40:15
- Label: China
- Producer: Anne Dudley, Jaz Coleman

Professional ratings
Review scores
Source	Rating
Allmusic	link

Songs from the Victorious City is an album in the world music genre written by Anne Dudley and Jaz Coleman, recorded in 1990 in Cairo and London. It takes its name from Cairo itself, in Arabic القاهرة (pronounced: al-Qahirah), literally "The Triumphant" or "The Victorious".

== Track listing ==
All tracks composed and arranged by Anne Dudley and Jaz Coleman
No.	Title	Length
1.	"The Awakening"	4:47
2.	"Endless Festival"	3:59
3.	"Minarets and Memories"	3:25
4.	"Force and Fire"	5:08
5.	"Habebe"	3:47
6.	"Ziggarats of Cinnamon"	3:06
7.	"Hannah"	4:14
8.	"The Conqueror"	3:15
9.	"A Survivor's Tale"	3:50
10.	"In a Timeless Place"	4:49

== Personnel ==
- Anne Dudley - keyboards
- Jaz Coleman - violin, cobra pipe, flute
- Rada Bedaire - nai
- Ibrahim Kowala - kawala
- Fouad Rohin - violin
- Amir Abd-el - kanun
- Aboud Abdel Al - violin
- Hossam Ramzy - percussion
- Cheikh Taha - accordion
- Gilbert Biberian - guitar
- Tareq Aakef - conductor of Cairo Strings

Technical

- Roger Dudley, Sameh Almazny - engineer
- Ted Hayton, Martin Rex (track 7) - mixing

== Samples ==
"Songs from the Victorious City" was sampled extensively on two songs by Enigma in 1993. Both "The Eyes of Truth" and "Age of Loneliness" contains distinctive Mongolian samples most notably, Alsyn Gazryn Zereglee (Алсын газрын зэрэглээ).
