= Trilogy (Enigma album) =

Box set by Enigma
- Released: 2 November 1998
- Recorded: 1990–1996
- Studios: A.R.T. Studios, Ibiza
- Genres: New-age; ambient
- Length: 130:00
- Labels: Virgin Schallplatten GmbH; EMI
- Producer: Michael Cretu

Enigma chronology
Le Roi Est Mort, Vive Le Roi! (1996)	Trilogy (1998)	The Screen Behind the Mirror (2000)

Trilogy is a box set by the German musical project Enigma. This set includes the first three studio albums by Enigma, MCMXC a.D., The Cross of Changes, and Le Roi Est Mort, Vive Le Roi!, which comprises their artistic output from 1990–1996.

== Box set contents ==
- MCMXC a.D. (1990)
- The Cross of Changes (1993)
- Le Roi est mort, vive le Roi! (1996)

== Certifications ==
Region	Certification	Certified units/sales
United Kingdom (BPI)	Silver	60,000^{‡}
^{‡} Sales+streaming figures based on certification alone.
