= Angel Gracia =

American film director and producer

Ángel Gracia
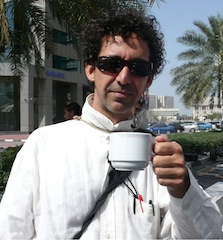
- Angel Gracia on set.
- Born: Angel Gracia
- Occupations: film director, cinematographer, producer, screenwriter, editor,
- Notable work: From Prada to Nada, The Three Cornered Hat
- Website: Angel Gracia

Ángel Gracia is a Venezuelan-American film director. In 2010, Gracia directed his first feature film, From Prada to Nada, which starred Alexa Vega, Camilla Belle, Wilmer Valderrama and Adriana Barraza. The film was nominated for NCLR's Alma Awards 2011 Best Picture and won two Alma Awards and two Imagen Awards, including Favorite Movie Actress and supporting actress.

== Early career ==
His career started when he won a Student Academy Awards for his experimental short "The Three Cornered Hat", a flamenco short film.

The following year he won an Emmy for his music video "If I Were Alone" for singer song writer John Bauer.

Shortly thereafter, he won MTV's first-ever music video contest for Madonna's "True Blue" single, which went to win an Emmy and became one of the network's most requested videos.

This video caught the attention of Geffen Records which offered him a contract to direct in-house music videos; which led to a collaboration with hit artist Snap! making 6 of their music videos, including the ground breaking 3D and Motion Controlled video for their hit single "The World in my Hand", which led the giant label BMG Ariola to move him to England to direct videos for some of Europe's top artists, including Enigma's award-winning music video for their single "Out from the Deep", one of the first video fully integrating live action with computer graphics animation.

Today, his work includes jobs for globally-known powerhouses like Coca-Cola, Mercedes, Honda, Toyota, Ford, VW, Dodge, MasterCard, Coors, ING, Schweppes, Snickers and FIAT, and celebrities such as Shaquille O'Neal, soccer legends Kaká and Fabio Capello, as well as actors including Penélope Cruz, Val Kilmer, Terry Crews, Sofia Vergara, Julianne Moore, Eugenio Derbez, Jose Feliciano and Hugh Laurie.

== Career ==
Angel was a partner at Ridley Scott and Associates during 5 years with his company "La Division @ RSA." His vast experience in advertising earned him numerous national and international awards, including several "Lions" for Cannes Lions International Advertising Festival.

In 1998 he directed a TV movie for BMG / Ariola's European division entitled 5NY "The Spirit", based on the real life of a group of young musicians signed to the label with designed to promote their record release. It was the first reality based TV movie about musicians in the industry.

In 2001 he signed with Ridley Scott's RSA Films to direct commercials worldwide.

In 2023 he produced the movie King of Killers, starring Frank Grillo and Stephen Dorf. Also in 2023 he produced and directed the movie How The Gringo Stole Christmas, starring George Lopez, Mariana Trevino, Jack Kilmer, and Emily Tosta.

He works as a director of TV commercials and online video content through different production companies around the world.

== Work ==
1986 — "True Blue" – Madonna (MTV Music Video Contest)

1987 – Student Academy Awards for his experimental short "The Three Cornered Hat"

1990 — The Disturbance (Feature Film) [cinematographer]

1994 — "Out from the Deep" – Enigma (Music Video)

1997 — "Kaleidoscope Skies" – Jam & Spoon (Music Video)

2007 — "Moonlight" – Alex Luna (Music Video)

2011 — From Prada to Nada (Feature Film)

2015 – "Table Manners" – (TV pilot)

2022 – King of Killers (Feature Film)

2023 - How The Gringo Stole Christmas (Feature Film)

== Awards and nominations ==
Alma Awards

- Winner, Best Actress From Prada to Nada (2011)
- Winner Supporting Actress From Prada to Nada (2011)
- Nominated, Best Picture "From Prada to Nada" (2011)

Student Academy Awards

- Winner, Experimental The Three Cornered Hat (1986)
