= Carly's Song =

Single by Enigma

from the album Sliver: Music from the Motion Picture
- B-side: "Carly's Loneliness"
- Released: 1 November 1993
- Studio: A.R.T. Studios, Ibiza
- Genre: Trip hop; New age
- Length: 3:47
- Label: Virgin
- Songwriter: Michael Cretu
- Producer: Michael Cretu

Enigma singles chronology
"The Rivers of Belief" (1991)	"Carly's Song" (1993)	"Return to Innocence" (1993)

"Carly's Song" is a song created by the musical project Enigma for the 1993 film Sliver, starring Sharon Stone. Released as a single in Australia by Virgin Records, it peaked at number 91 on the ARIA singles chart in November 1993, spending one week in the top 100.

== Overview ==
The song is featured on the soundtrack of the 1993 movie Sliver. The song uses samples from the Mongolian traditional long song, "Tosonguyn Oroygoor", sung by Dechinzundui Nadmid. This song is also featured in the Tamil film "Baasha" (1995) as villain Mark Antony's (Raghuvaran) intro bgm.

This song was later remixed and re-released as "Age of Loneliness" on Enigma's second studio album, The Cross of Changes.

== Critical reception ==
Larry Flick from Billboard magazine wrote, "Act that left many panting with 'Sadeness' returns with hypnotic down-tempo gem, layered with an insinuating, shuffling hip-hop beat, and primal female chanting. Track gets its movement and color from a subtle use of African percussion and unusual keyboard effects. Requisite heavy breathing adds to its sensual ambience." He added, "Don't miss the heavily bewigged Sharon Stone in the videoclip!" Alan Jones from Music Week felt the song was featured in Sliver "to great effect".

== Track listing ==
1. "Carly's Song" – 3:47
2. "Carly's Song" (Jam & Spoon Remix) – 6:31
3. "Carly's Loneliness" – 3:11
4. "Carly's Song" (Instrumental) – 4:00

== Charts ==
Chart (1993)	Peak position
Australia (ARIA)	91
