= The Fall of a Rebel Angel =

2016 studio album by Enigma

Studio album by Enigma
- Released: 11 November 2016
- Recorded: March 2015 – May 2016
- Studios: Merlin, an all-in-one mobile digital studio
- Genres: New age; pop; electronica; downtempo; synth-pop
- Length: 48:15
- Labels: Island; Republic (US)
- Producer: Michael Cretu

Enigma chronology
The Platinum Collection (2009)	The Fall of a Rebel Angel (2016)	Enigma 9 (est. 2027)

Singles from The Fall of a Rebel Angel
- 1. "Sadeness (Part II)" Released: 10 October 2016; 2. "Amen" Released: 18 November 2016

Professional ratings
Review scores
Source	Rating
AllMusic	3/5 stars
laut.de	1/5 stars

The Fall of a Rebel Angel is the eighth studio album by the German musical project Enigma, released on 11 November 2016 by Republic Records. The first studio album since Seven Lives Many Faces (2008), it is a concept album that tells the story of a protagonist's journey of development and change to find a new, fulfilling life. The album was developed by Enigma's founder, producer, and principal composer, Michael Cretu and German lyricist and librettist Michael Kunze. Its artwork was designed by Wolfgang Beltracchi. It is the first Enigma album recorded for Universal Music after the former's purchase of the majority of EMI's assets.

== Production ==
=== Background ===
The Fall of a Rebel Angel is the first release from Enigma since its 2010 fan collaboration track "MMX" to commemorate the twentieth anniversary of the musical project, and its first studio album since Seven Lives Many Faces (2008). Michael Cretu, Enigma's founder, principal composer and producer, spent one year "testing and experimenting" for a new Enigma studio album prior to recording. Cretu aimed to return to the Enigma sound adopted in its early years which earned the group its biggest international commercial and critical success, adding his wish "to transfer the spirit of Enigma's beginnings to the here and now, but in a new musical language". As the new album would be its eighth, Cretu wanted to make the album with a more complex idea behind it, with the number "8" being a symbol for "a new beginning". Having spent a period of four years recording music for a musical based on the German silent film Metropolis (1927) which involved German lyricist and librettist Michael Kunze, Cretu took a liking to writing music to a story, and wished to pursue such a concept for a new Enigma album. The two had previously worked together during Cretu's time as a solo artist in the 1980s, writing the German lyrics to his 1985 hit single "Samurai". Cretu asked Kunze to write a story for the new Enigma album, to which Kunze agreed. Cretu already had The Fall of a Rebel Angel in his head as a title for the project, and after several brainstorming sessions at Kunze's home in Hamburg, selected 10 out of 20 situations that Kunze had outlined for the album's story and developed them further.

=== Recording ===
On 19 March 2015, a quote from Cretu posted on the official Enigma page on Facebook revealed that recording for The Fall of a Rebel Angel had begun. A video update posted on 19 January 2016 revealed that five months were left to complete the album, during which three songs had yet to be completed. The album features four guest artists: Brazilian singer-songwriter Mark Josher, Indonesian singer Anggun, Nanuk as female voice in intro, and English electro-pop duo Aquilo. Its artwork was designed and illustrated by German artist Wolfgang Beltracchi, who also designed 12 paintings that accompany each of the album's "chapters".

The album was recorded on Merlin, an all-in-one mobile digital studio that is the successor to a larger version of the unit named Alchemist, which Cretu operated to record Seven Lives Many Faces. The machine was built specifically for Cretu and his way of recording. First used to record "MMX (The Social Song)", Merlin is roughly one third the size and weight of Alchemist and incorporates an Apple Mac Pro computer running the Logic Pro digital audio workstation software, an LG 21:9 aspect ratio monitor, three 3 terabyte LaCie hard disks, a Mark of the Unicorn analogue/digital interface, an 88-key keyboard, and surround sound speakers.

=== Story ===
The Fall of a Rebel Angel is a concept album formed of 12 "chapter-like" tracks that tells a surreal narrative, based on an epic poem written for the album by Kunze, about a male protagonist's journey of development and change to find a new, fulfilling life. Cretu described the story as a "symbolic journey to redemption – with everyone to define his individual path" combined with "psychedelic undertones". He quotes from various literature, religious, and pop culture sources to aid the story which includes themes of sexuality, faith, and death. In one chapter, the character wanders through an imaginary town and encounters a priestess whose god is the Marquis de Sade, thus becoming a continuation of the story to "Sadeness (Part I)", the worldwide hit single from Enigma's debut album, MCMXC a.D. (1990). The story concludes with the individual breaking their reflection in the water of a lake, accepting responsibility for his life.

== Release ==
The album was officially announced on 8 August 2016 with a scheduled release date of 11 November.

Four editions of the album were made available on Republic Records, a division of Universal Music Group.

- The standard edition on single disc includes a 28-page booklet and the 12 "chapter" paintings by Beltracchi.
- The two-disc limited deluxe edition digipak features a 12-track narration of the album's story and a 40-page booklet.
- The limited super deluxe edition includes a signed picture frame and exclusive online content.
- The gatefold vinyl edition has the 12 Beltracchi paintings and a 16-page booklet.
- "Sadeness (Part II)" (featuring Anggun) was released as a digital download on 10 October 2016 for those who pre-ordered the album.

Following the album's completion, Cretu felt proud of the album. In May 2018, the album was reissued on a limited-edition coloured vinyl as part of The Colours of Enigma series, which includes all prior studio albums.

== Track listing ==
The Fall of a Rebel Angel – Standard edition
No.	Title	Lyrics	Music	Length
1.	"Circle Eight" (featuring Nanuk)	Michael Kunze	Michael Cretu	2:17
2.	"The Omega Point"	Kunze, Cretu	Cretu, Kunze	5:39
3.	"Diving"	Kunze, Cretu	Cretu, Kunze	2:52
4.	"The Die Is Cast" (featuring Mark Josher)	Kunze, Cretu, Marcelo Amaral Pontello	Cretu, Pontello	4:17
5.	"Mother" (featuring Anggun)	Kunze	Cretu	3:38
6.	"Agnus Dei"	Kunze, Cretu	Cretu	3:54
7.	"Sadeness (Part II)" (featuring Anggun)	Kunze, Cretu	Cretu	4:10
8.	"Lost in Nothingness"	Kunze, Cretu	Cretu	5:14
9.	"Oxygen Red" (featuring Anggun)	Kunze	Cretu	4:03
10.	"Confession of the Mind"	Kunze, Cretu	Cretu	3:48
11.	"Absolvo"	Kunze, Cretu	Cretu	3:29
12.	"Amen" (featuring Aquilo)	Kunze	Cretu	4:54
Total length:				44:58

=== Narration tracks ===
The Super Deluxe Edition includes the album's story audio narrated over 12 tracks in three languages, for a total of 36 tracks. The English version is narrated by Ian Wood, Spanish by Manuel Sanchez Fraguas, and French by Patrice Luc Doumeyrou. The English language version is available in HTML5 format on Enigma's website.

All tracks are written by Michael Cretu and Michael Kunze.

The Story of 'The Fall of a Rebel Angel – Limited deluxe edition bonus tracks
No.	Title	Length
1.	"The Story of 'Circle Eight'"	1:01
2.	"The Story of 'The Omega Point'"	1:50
3.	"The Story of 'Diving'"	1:26
4.	"The Story of 'The Die Is Cast'"	2:00
5.	"The Story of 'Mother'"	2:03
6.	"The Story of 'Agnus Dei'"	2:49
7.	"The Story of 'Sadeness (Part II)'"	2:38
8.	"The Story of 'Lost in Nothingness'"	1:46
9.	"The Story of 'Oxygen Red'"	1:56
10.	"The Story of 'Confession of the Mind'"	2:43
11.	"The Story of 'Absolvo'"	1:27
12.	"The Story of 'Amen'"	1:38
13.	"La Historia de 'Circle Eight'"	1:01
14.	"La Historia de 'The Omega Point'"	1:50
15.	"La Historia de 'Diving'"	1:26
16.	"La Historia de 'The Die Is Cast'"	2:00
17.	"La Historia de 'Mother'"	2:03
18.	"La Historia de 'Agnus Dei'"	2:49
19.	"La Historia de 'Sadeness (Part II)'"	2:38
20.	"La Historia de 'Lost in Nothingness'"	1:46
21.	"La Historia de 'Oxygen Red'"	1:56
22.	"La Historia de 'Confession of the Mind'"	2:43
23.	"La Historia de 'Absolvo'"	1:27
24.	"La Historia de 'Amen'"	1:38
25.	"L'histoire de 'Circle Eight'"	1:01
26.	"L'histoire de 'The Omega Point'"	1:50
27.	"L'histoire de 'Diving'"	1:26
28.	"L'histoire de 'The Die Is Cast'"	2:00
29.	"L'histoire de 'Mother'"	2:03
30.	"L'histoire de 'Agnus Dei'"	2:49
31.	"L'histoire de 'Sadeness (Part II)'"	2:38
32.	"L'histoire de 'Lost in Nothingness'"	1:46
33.	"L'histoire de 'Oxygen Red'"	1:56
34.	"L'histoire de 'Confession of the Mind'"	2:43
35.	"L'histoire de 'Absolvo'"	1:27
36.	"L'histoire de 'Amen'"	1:38

== Personnel ==
Enigma

- Michael Cretu – music, lyrics, story, production, programming, arrangements, engineering

Additional personnel

- Anggun – vocals on "Mother", "Sadeness (Part II)", and "Oxygen Red"
- Aquilo – vocals on "Amen"
- Nanuk – featured performer voice on "Circle Eight"
- Mark Josher (Marcelo Amaral Pontello) – vocals on "The Die Is Cast"
- Michael Kunze – story, co-author
- Wolfgang Beltracchi – cover art
- Ian Wood – album story narrator (English)
- Manuel Sanchez Fraguas – album story narrator (Spanish)
- Patrice Luc Doumeyrou – album story narrator (French)

== Charts ==
=== Weekly charts ===
Weekly chart performance for The Fall of a Rebel Angel
Chart (2016)	Peak position
Australian Albums (ARIA)	73
Austrian Albums (Ö3 Austria)	24
Belgian Albums (Ultratop Flanders)	37
Belgian Albums (Ultratop Wallonia)	61
Czech Albums (ČNS IFPI)	19
Dutch Albums (Album Top 100)	29
French Albums (SNEP)	71
German Albums (Offizielle Top 100)	10
Greek Albums (IFPI)	70
Italian Albums (FIMI)	42
Japanese Albums (Oricon)	184
New Zealand Heatseekers Albums (RMNZ)	8
Polish Albums (ZPAV)	23
Portuguese Albums (AFP)	32
Scottish Albums (Official Charts)	49
Spanish Albums (Promusicae)	38
Swiss Albums (Schweizer Hitparade)	19
UK Albums (Official Charts)	40
US Billboard 200	122
US New Age Albums (Billboard)	1
US Top Dance/Electronic Albums (Billboard)	1

=== Year-end charts ===
Year-end chart performance for The Fall of a Rebel Angel
Chart (2017)	Position
US New Age Albums (Billboard)	7
