= Die Chinesische Mauer =

Studio album by Michael Cretu
- Released: 1985
- Recorded: 1984
- Studio: Data Alpha Studio
- Genre: Synth-pop
- Length: 35:04
- Label: Virgin
- Producer: Michael Cretu; Armand Volker

Michael Cretu chronology
Legionäre (1983)	Die Chinesische Mauer (1985)	Belle Epoque (1988)

The Invisible Man

Singles from Die Chinesische Mauer/The Invisible Man
- 1. "Schwarzer Engel" Released: 1984; 2. "Samurai" Released: 1985; 3. "Carte Blanche" Released: 1985; 4. "Silver Water" Released: 1985; 5. "Die Chinesische Mauer" Released: 1985; 6. "Gambit" Released: 1986

Die Chinesische Mauer is the third studio album by Romanian-German musician Michael Cretu, released in 1985. The literal English translation of the title is "the Chinese wall", or as it is better known, "The Great Wall of China". Like his previous album, Legionäre, the lyrics on Die Chinesische Mauer were sung in German by Cretu himself, and the record was co-produced by Armand Volker. The album was also released separately with English lyrics and a different track listing, under the name The Invisible Man. Several of the tracks on it were edited slightly and therefore have a different running time, and sides 1 and 2 were swapped. The song "Samurai" was released as a single and became a hit in Europe (#1 Greece, #2 Switzerland, #4 Italy, #4 Sweden, #12 Germany). In 1986, after the success of the single "Gambit", the English version of the album was re-released on LP in Europe to feature this new song, but with the track "Carte Blanche" removed. This edition featured a new cover and package design. The album was recorded entirely at Cretu's home studio, Data Alpha Studio.

== Track listing ==
=== Die Chinesische Mauer ===
1. "Intro" – 2:28
2. "Mikado" – 3:17
3. "Coda" – 0:59
4. "Amazonen" – 5:19
5. "Die Chinesische Mauer" – 5:01
6. "Samurai" – 5:22
7. "Carte Blanche" – 3:56
8. "Schwarzer Engel" – 5:18
9. "Zinnsoldat" – 3:24

=== The Invisible Man ===
1. "Samurai (Did You Ever Dream)" – 5:13
2. "Carte Blanche (Ride on with the Breeze)" – 3:24
3. "Silver Water" – 4:42
4. "Your Favorite Toy" – 3:26
5. "Intro" – 2:27
6. "Mikado" – 3:14
7. "Coda" – 0:59
8. "Heavy Traffic" – 4:57
9. "The Invisible Man" – 5:01

=== The Invisible Man (1986 LP reissue) ===
1. "Gambit" – 4:35
2. "Samurai (Did You Ever Dream)" – 5:13
3. "Silver Water" – 4:40
4. "Your Favorite Toy" – 3:24
5. "Intro" – 2:28
6. "Mikado" – 3:13
7. "Coda" – 0:59
8. "Heavy Traffic" – 4:54
9. "The Invisible Man" – 5:01

== Personnel ==
- Mats Bjorklund – guitar
- Peter Cornelius – guitar
- Curt Cress – percussion, drums
- Michael Cretu – keyboards, vocals, production, electric drums, drum programming
- Christian Felke – saxophone
- Mike Schmidt – artwork
- Armand Volker – production

== Charts ==
Chart (1985)	Peak position
German Albums (Offizielle Top 100)	62
