= Beyond the Invisible =

Single by Enigma

from the album Le Roi est mort, vive le Roi!
- B-side: "Almost Full Moon"; "Light of Your Smile"
- Released: 29 October 1996
- Recorded: 1996
- Studio: A.R.T. Studios, Ibiza
- Genre: New-age; ambient; electronic
- Length: 4:30
- Label: Virgin/EMI
- Songwriters: Michael Cretu; Fabrice Jean Roger Cuitad
- Producer: Michael Cretu

Enigma singles chronology
"Out from the Deep" (1994)	"Beyond the Invisible" (1996)	"T.N.T. for the Brain" (1997)

Music video
- "Beyond the Invisible" on YouTube

"Beyond the Invisible" is a song by German musical project Enigma. It was released in October 1996 by Virgin/EMI as the first of only two singles taken from their third album, Le Roi est mort, vive le Roi! (1996). It was written by Michael Cretu and Fabrice Jean Roger Cuitad, and produced by Cretu. The accompanying music video was directed by Julien Temple and filmed in the UK. A remake of the song was released by Scooter in 2011.

== Production ==
In "Beyond the Invisible", Sandra Cretu again provides the opening vocals, Michael Cretu sings lead vocals. The track also includes samples of a Latvian folk ensemble Rasa song Sajāja Bramaņi and a Gregorian chant (Isaiah 64:9-11) from "Gregoriani Cantus" by Pierre Kaelin. Most of the tracks on Le Roi Est Mort, Vive Le Roi! include both Gregorian chants and tribal chants, reminiscent of their first and second albums, MCMXC a.D. and The Cross of Changes.

== Release ==
The 4 and 5-track versions of the single also contain "Light of Your Smile", which is not on the parent album, Le Roi est mort, vive le Roi!.

== Critical reception ==
Larry Flick from Billboard magazine described the song as "a soothing foray into the land of Gregorian chants and hypnotic new age melodies." He added, "The track gets its primary movement from a quietly knocking electro-funk beat and a subtle undercurrent of guitars. A nice fit for a variety of radio formats, this track will sound particularly good right next to the equally plush rhythm-pop musings of Robert Miles." A reviewer from Music Week gave it a score of four out of five, writing, "Hypnotic ethnic chanting (this time from a Latvian choir), a super catchy melody and a bit of opera add up to another surefire global smash." The magazine also noted that "Michael Cretu is in fine voice on a strong single that has touches of Pink Floyd. A very different sound that will find fans given enough radio exposure."

== Music video ==
The music video for "Beyond the Invisible" was directed by British film, documentary and music video director Julien Temple and features an actress running from a trailer park then continues with two ice dancers (the Finnish ice dance couple Susanna Rahkamo and Petri Kokko) skating in a forest. The video was shot in Savernake Forest, Marlborough, Wiltshire, United Kingdom. The ice rink was constructed especially for the video and took over a week to freeze. Simon Scotland, line producer on the video, subsequently used the title Beyond the Invisible as the name for his Home Cinema and Entertainment company.

== Track listing ==
All lyrics written by Michael Cretu and David Fairstein, music by Cretu.

- CD, Single
1. "Beyond the Invisible (Radio Edit)" – 4:30
2. "Almost Full Moon" – 3:40
- Cassette, Single
1. "Short Radio Edit" – 3:42
2. "Radio Edit" – 4:30
3. "Album Version" – 5:05
- Vinyl, 12"
1. "Beyond The Invisible (Radio Edit)" – 4:30
2. "Almost Full Moon" – 3:42
3. "Beyond The Invisible (Album Version)" – 5:05
4. "Light of Your Smile" – 5:10
- CD, Maxi-Single
1. "Beyond the Invisible (Radio Edit)" – 4:30
2. "Almost Full Moon" – 3:42
3. "Beyond the Invisible (Album Version)" – 5:05
4. "Light of Your Smile" – 5:10
5. "Beyond the Invisible (Short Radio Edit)" – 3:42

== Charts ==
Chart (1996)	Peak position
Australia (ARIA)	57
Austria (Ö3 Austria Top 40)	20
Europe (Eurochart Hot 100)	46
Europe (European Hit Radio)	20
Europe Border Breakers (Music & Media)	2
Finland (Suomen virallinen lista)	6
France (SNEP)	32
Germany (GfK)	40
Israel (Israeli Singles Chart)	3
Netherlands (Dutch Top 40 Tipparade)	4
Netherlands (Single Top 100)	27
New Zealand (Recorded Music NZ)	45
Norway (VG-lista)	13
Scottish Singles Sales (Official Charts)	28
Sweden (Sverigetopplistan)	29
Switzerland (Schweizer Hitparade)	36
Taiwan (IFPI)	8
UK Singles (Official Charts)	26
US Billboard Hot 100	81
