= Silhouettes (Aquilo album) =

Studio album by Aquilo
- Released: 27 January 2017
- Recorded: 2014–16
- Genre: Electronica; dream pop; ambient; alternative dance
- Label: Island
- Producer: Aquilo; Sohn; Ólafur Arnalds; Jonathan Green; Johnny McDaid; Lexxx; Eg White; Felix Joseph; Ben Hayes; Jay Heigl

Aquilo chronology
Midnight (Live) EP (2016)	Silhouettes (2017)	ii (2018)

Singles from Silhouettes
- 1. "Sorry" Released: 10 November 2016; 2. "You Won't Know Where You Stand" Released: 11 January 2017; 3. "Silhouette" Released: 18 January 2017; 4. "Almost Over" Released: 25 January 2017

Silhouettes is the debut studio album by British indie band Aquilo. It was released on 27 January 2017 through Island Records. The album includes songs from previous extended play releases, including "Human", "You Won't Know Where You Stand", "I Gave It All", "Never Seen You Get So Low" and "Waiting". The lead single from the album, entitled "Sorry", was released on 10 November 2016.

== Critical reception ==
Professional ratings
Aggregate scores
Source	Rating
Metacritic	75/100
Review scores
Source	Rating
Clash	8/10
Exclaim!	7/10
The 405	7/10
The Guardian	3/5 stars
Mixmag	8/10 stars
Pigeons & Planes	Very positive
PressPlayOK	3/5 stars
The VLM	7/10
VultureHound	4/5 stars

Silhouettes received positive reviews from music critics. At Metacritic, which assigns a normalised rating out of 100 to reviews from mainstream critics, the album received an average score of 75, based on five professional reviews. Clash writer Shannon Cotton said that "crafted to perfection, ‘Silhouettes’ is outstanding in its audible beauty". Bernadette McNulty of The Guardian gave the album three stars out of five, calling it "melancholy but slit", and saying that "vocalist Tom Higham deploys his requisite falsetto sparingly, but the surfeit of emotion and tranquillity [sic] flattens their musical landscape". Anna Alger from Exclaim! noted that "Aquilo captivate most when they vary the tempo and instrumentation within their songs, and they do it often enough to make Silhouettes a strong debut overall". Will Fisher wrote a positive review for The VLM, saying that "Aquilo occasionally fall foul to the cliches that saturate this genre", but "as a debut however, Silhouettes is a refreshing introduction to a compelling new band who just have the occasional beige moment".

Another positive review was written by Jessie Morris of Pigeons & Planes, who compared Silhouettes' music to the sound of artists like The xx, Sigur Rós and Radiohead, praising the "well-established electronics vein windswept and tender pop bleeding with a broken heart". A positive review came by Hannah Mylrea from the magazine The 405: "Silhouettes is a journey through the duo’s expansive sound. Although sometimes the journey gets bumpy, and Aquilo lose their way to sleepy filler, they always manage to find their way back to the dreamy, lush pop and rich electronic tapestries that makes part of this record such a triumph". Mixmag crew gave to the album an average of eight out of ten and wrote that "Lancaster duo Ben Fletcher and Tom Higham create spellbinding and atmospheric pop that’s perfect for wintry church concerts. Like a warm embrace on an icy morning, the pair's captivating harmonies come together effortlessly on debut album ‘Silhouette’".

=== Accolades ===
Publication	Accolade	Year	Rank	Ref.
Mixmag	18 albums you need to hear this February	2017	n/a	

== Track listing ==
Silhouettes
No.	Title	Writer(s)	Producer(s)	Length
1.	"Silhouette"	Tom Higham; Ben Fletcher; Jonathan Green	AQUILO; Green; Ólafur Arnalds^{[a]}	3:50
2.	"Blindside"	Higham; Fletcher; Francis Anthony White	AQUILO; Arnalds; Eg White	3:15
3.	"Human"	Higham; Fletcher; Christopher Taylor	AQUILO; SOHN	3:56
4.	"Never Hurt Again"	Higham; Fletcher; Felix Joseph; Thomas Havelock	AQUILO; Joseph	3:00
5.	"Almost Over"	Higham; Fletcher; Dan Wilson	AQUILO; Arnalds	3:16
6.	"You Won't Know Where You Stand"	Higham; Fletcher; Edward Thomas	AQUILO; Lexxx	2:52
7.	"I Gave It All"	Higham; Fletcher	AQUILO	3:51
8.	"All I Ever Wanted"	Higham; Fletcher	AQUILO	2:30
9.	"Sorry"	Higham; Fletcher; Johnny McDaid	AQUILO; McDaid	4:15
10.	"Complication"	Higham; Fletcher; Amber Simone Mc Neil; Robin Hannibal	AQUILO	3:13
11.	"Never Seen You Get So Low"	Higham; Fletcher	AQUILO	3:00
12.	"Low Light"	Higham; Fletcher	AQUILO; Jay Heigl^{[a]}; Ben Hayes^{[a]}	3:33
13.	"Always Done What You Say"	Higham; Fletcher	AQUILO; Joseph	3:39
14.	"Waiting"	Higham; Fletcher; Taylor	AQUILO	3:46
Total length:				47:00

Note

- ^{^{[a]}} signifies an additional producer.

== Charts ==
=== Weekly charts ===
Chart (2017)	Peak position
UK Update Albums (OCC)	64
