= II (Aquilo album) =

ii

Studio album by Aquilo
- Released: 4 May 2018
- Label: Island Records
- Producer: Aquilo; Bruno Major; Bastian Langebaek

Aquilo chronology
| Silhouettes (2017) | ii (2018) |

II (stylized as ii) is the second studio album by British musical duo Aquilo. It was released on 4 May 2018 through Island Records. ii includes earlier singles released in the EP ii (Side A), in November 2017, and other five new tracks.

== Track listing ==
Note: Track list adapted from Apple Music.

| No. | Title | Writer(s) | Producer(s) | Length |
|---|---|---|---|---|
| 1. | "I Could Fight on a Wall" | Thomas Higham; Benjamin Fletcher | AQUILO | 3:30 |
| 2. | "Thin" | Higham; Fletcher; Edward Thomas | AQUILO | 2:58 |
| 3. | "Ghost" | Higham; Fletcher; Thomas | AQUILO | 2:57 |
| 4. | "Six Feet Over Ground" | Higham; Fletcher; Amber-Simone McNeil | AQUILO | 2:49 |
| 5. | "Who Are You" | Higham; Fletcher | AQUILO | 3:04 |
| 6. | "The Road Less Wandered" | Higham; Fletcher; Bruno Major | AQUILO; Major | 3:23 |
| 7. | "Silent Movies" | Higham; Fletcher; Jonathan Green | AQUILO | 3:21 |
| 8. | "Now & Here" | Higham; Fletcher; Bastian Langebæk | AQUILO; Langebæk | 2:39 |
| 9. | "Seagull" | Higham; Fletcher | AQUILO | 4:04 |
| 10. | "I Lost a Bet" | Higham; Fletcher | AQUILO | 2:10 |
| Total length: | | | | 30:00 |
