= Samurai (song) =

1985 single by Michael Cretu

Single by Michael Cretu

from the album Die Chinesische Mauer
- B-side: "Sword of Fear"
- Released: 7 September 1985
- Genre: Synth-pop
- Length: 4:28
- Label: Virgin
- Songwriters: Michael Cretu; Richard Palmer-James
- Producers: Michael Cretu; Armand Volker

Michael Cretu singles chronology
"Die Chinesische Mauer" (1985)	"Samurai" (1985)	"Carte Blanche" (1985)

"Samurai" is a song by Romanian-German singer-songwriter Michael Cretu from his third studio album, Die Chinesische Mauer (1985).

== Composition and chart performance ==
In the lyrics, the protagonist of the song shows how frustrating his live act is.

A German-language version of the song was also released around the same time as the English version, but it was not a commercial success unlike the English version which reached the top 10 in a number of countries across Europe.

== Music video ==
The plot of the music video features Michael Cretu with some studio musicians in a dojo, while two kendōkas are fighting against each other.

== Track listing and formats ==
- European 7-inch single

A. "Samurai (Did You Ever Dream)" – 4:28
B. "Sword of Fear" – 3:55

- European 12-inch maxi-single

A. "Samurai (Did You Ever Dream)" (Long Version) – 7:01
B1. "Samurai (Did You Ever Dream)" – 4:28
B2. "Sword of Fear" (Instrumental) – 3:55

== Charts ==
Weekly chart performance for "Samurai"
Chart (1985)	Peak position
Austria (Ö3 Austria Top 40)	3
Finland (Suomen virallinen lista)	5
Italy (Musica e dischi)	7
Sweden (Sverigetopplistan)	4
Switzerland (Schweizer Hitparade)	2
West Germany (GfK)	12
