= Difang and Igay Duana =

Taiwanese farmers and musicians

- Born: Difang: March 20, 1921; Igay: August 9, 1922
- Died: Difang: March 29, 2002 (aged 81); Igay: April 19, 2002 (aged 79)
- Occupations: Farmers; Musicians

Difang Duana (March 20, 1921 – March 29, 2002) and Igay Duana (August 9, 1922 – April 19, 2002), also known by the Chinese names Kuo Ying-nan (郭英男) and Kuo Hsiu-chu (郭秀珠), were Amis husband and wife farmers from Taiwan who became known as a folk music duo who specialized in traditional Amis chants. Their most recognized work is a performance of a traditional Amis Palang song, alternately called "Weeding and Paddyfield Song No. 1", "Elders' Drinking Song", "Jubilant Drinking Song" and "Song of Joy", or Sapiliepah a Radiw in the Amis language. The song was recorded by a French government project and was subsequently sampled by the musical project Enigma for their international hit single "Return to Innocence", released by Virgin. Accusations of unintentional usage without permission were settled out of court.

== Early life ==
Difang was born in 1921 in the Taitung Falangaw Tribe, a member of the "Revival" groups (latihmok) in the Amis age hierarchy. He was a highly respected elder known for his gifted, sonorous vocal and lead singing techniques, often listed by ethnomusicologists as an important informant.

== Musical career ==
In 1988, Difang and Igay took part in the "Asia-Pacific Indigenous Dance and Music Festival" hosted by the Maison des cultures du monde in Paris, together with the Paiwan tribe from Sandimen of Pingtung County and the Bunun tribe from Wulu Village of Yanping Township of Taitung County, under the arrangements of ethnomusicologist Hsu Tsang-Houei, Tsai Li-hua and Hsu Ying-chou. The roughly 30 aboriginal Taiwanese artists sang on tour for a month and were paid $15 a day. The performances of the festival were recorded and released the following year in the album Polyphonies vocales des aborigènes de Taïwan, produced by the Maison des cultures du monde.

Five years later, Michael Cretu, founder of the Ibiza-based Romanian/German musical project Enigma, believing the recording to be in the public domain, sampled a portion of a song called "Song of Joy" (palafang) (Note: 明立國. Palafang was originally translated as “Elders Drinking Song”; but "Song of Joy" is more accurate as it is meant to be sung on joyful and festive occasions and has nothing to do with drinking.) recorded by Difang in France, and mixed it into the Enigma song "Return to Innocence", which was then selected as the theme song for the 1996 Summer Olympic Games. However, Difang had not authorized them to sample his song; and with the event underway, a controversy surrounding indigenous culture and copyright soon emerged. Ethnomusicologist Ming Li-kuo also wrote about the conflict between the copyright system and oral tradition culture and even the inheritance of culture, as well as the potential impact on cultural development. After Taiwanese press agencies identified the Duanas' performance, the couple were offered a contract with Magic Stone Records, a subsidiary of the Taiwanese indie label, Rock Records; their music achieved little exposure outside of Taiwan.

The Duanas filed suit against Cretu and EMI for violation of copyright in 1998. The suit was settled out of court in June 1999 for an undisclosed amount. According to a Magic Stone spokeswoman, the company brought the case on Difang's behalf, and Enigma's recording company agreed to compensate him in the settlement. Under the settlement, the Duanas were to be credited on all future releases of the song, and the couple announced plans to establish a foundation to preserve Amis culture and music. The couple reportedly used some of the money to set up a scholarship fund for Amis children. Enigma's music manager at Virgin Music Germany stated that Cretu had no intention of violating anyone's copyright. Difang commented that as long as people knew that this song was from the Amis of Taiwan and was sung by his wife and himself, then the two of them would accept it in good part. Magic Stone's attorney also won a suit against the French government, but the government insisted on giving the money to a folk art foundation in trust, and not to the Duanas. In response to the lawsuits, Robin Lee, director of Taiwan's Association of Recording Copyright Owners, said that since performers of traditional folk music are not authors, they have no copyright. The standard practice, however, is to list the music as traditional (no copyright), but the arrangement of it as copyrighted.

The media attention garnered by the Duanas' legal case piqued public interest in their music. Difang recorded his debut album Circle of Life in Taiwan in 1998 with the assistance of Belgian music producer Dan Lacksman of Deep Forest, in collaboration with Magic Stone Records. The ethnic electronica album was released under Difang's name, though both he and Igay perform on the record. It included his best-known song "Song of Joy" (palafang). The album sold well in Taiwan, and ranked 15th place in the IFPI. At the end of 1999, Difang released his second album, Across the Yellow Earth, which the next year won him the Best Ethnic Music Album at the 11th Golden Melody Awards, and he was also nominated for Best Male Singer.

== Death ==
Difang died on March 29, 2002, from sepsis. He had struggled with diabetes for many years, and his health deteriorated significantly after he was bitten by a centipede in October of the previous year. Igay died shortly thereafter, on April 19, 2002, after a lengthy battle with breast cancer. She had been initially diagnosed on July 8, 1996.

== Discography ==
- Uncredited ("anonymous") recording in Polyphonies vocales des aborigènes de Taïwan, Ministère de l'éducation nationale, 1988
- "Return to Innocence", Virgin Records (EMI), 1993
- Circle of Life, Magic Stone Records, 1998
- Across the Yellow Earth, Magic Stone Records, 1999
