= T.N.T. for the Brain =

Single by Enigma

from the album Le Roi est mort, vive le Roi!
- Released: 17 February 1997
- Recorded: 1996
- Studio: A.R.T. Studios, Ibiza
- Genre: New age
- Length: 4:00
- Label: Virgin / EMI
- Songwriter: Michael Cretu
- Producer: Michael Cretu

Enigma singles chronology
"Beyond the Invisible" (1996)	"T.N.T. for the Brain" (1997)	"Gravity of Love" (1999)

Music video
- "T.N.T. for the Brain" on YouTube

"T.N.T. for the Brain" is a song by German musical project Enigma, released in February 1997 by Virgin / EMI as the second and last from their third album, Le Roi est mort, vive le Roi! (1996). It peaked at number 60 in the UK.

== Overview ==
The Introduction samples "Horsell Common and the Heat Ray" from Jeff Wayne's Musical Version of The War of the Worlds.

== Critical reception ==
British magazine Music Week rated the song three out of five, adding, "More of the same for Enigma with this second offering from their latest gold album."

== Single track listing ==
- CD, Single, Promo
1. "Radio Edit" – 4:00
2. "Instrumental Mix" – 4:07
- Cassette, Single
1. "Radio Edit" – 4:00
2. "Instrumental Mix" – 4:07
3. "Midnight Man Remix" – 5:56
- Vinyl, 12"
1. "Radio Edit" – 4:00
2. "Midnight Man Remix" – 5:56
3. "Album Version" – 4:34
4. "Instrumental Mix" – 4:07
- CD, Maxi-Single
1. "Radio Edit" – 4:00
2. "Midnight Man Remix" – 5:56
3. "Album Version" – 4:34
4. "Instrumental Mix" – 4:07
5. "(Club Edit)" – 4:33

Track 5 is an edit of the "Midnight Man Remix"

== Charts ==
Chart (1997)	Peak position
Israel (Israeli Singles Chart)	4
Scotland (OCC)	61
UK Singles (OCC)	60
