= The Eyes of Truth =

1994 single by Enigma

Single by Enigma

from the album The Cross of Changes
- Released: 11 April 1994
- Genre: Ambient; techno
- Length: 4:36
- Label: Virgin
- Songwriter: Curly M.C.
- Producer: Michael Cretu

Enigma singles chronology
"Return to Innocence" (1993)	"The Eyes of Truth" (1994)	"Age of Loneliness" (1994)

Music video
- "The Eyes of Truth" on YouTube

"The Eyes of Truth" is a song by German new-age band Enigma, released in April 1994 by Virgin Records as the second single from their second album, The Cross of Changes (1993). The song is produced by Michael Cretu and similar with "Age of Loneliness", it features samples of Mongolian folk music (most notably Alsyn Gazryn Zereglee (Алсын газрын зэрэглээ)) and samples taken from Anne Dudley's album Songs from the Victorious City. It also contains samples from U2's song "Ultraviolet (Light My Way)", Peter Gabriel's "Kiss That Frog", NASA retransmissions sampled from "Mare Tranquillitatis" performed by Vangelis, and Genesis' "Dreaming While You Sleep". The accompanying music video for the song was recorded in the rural areas of Nepal. A portion of the song is used in the promotional trailer for the 1999 film The Matrix.

== Critical reception ==
Tim Jeffery from Music Week's RM Dance Update wrote, "Introed with the band's now familiar haunting ambient sounds and vocals, this quickly develops into a racing house groove with waves of synth, heavy metal guitar, more vocals and all sorts of bits and pieces. It doesn't seem to make up its mind whether it wants to be ambient or full-on techno and sometimes the combinations of sounds are a little odd. The B-side's dub version is a little easier to handle for DJs." Pan-European magazine Music & Media commented, "What would dance have been without Eno/Byrne's 1981 standard cult album My Life in the Bush of Ghosts, a combination of dance with ethnic chants. Mr. Cretu, however, reaches the masses."

== Track listing ==
1. Radio edit – 4:36
2. Album version – 7:27
3. The Götterdämmerung Mix (The Twilight of the Gods)– 7:17
4. Dub version – 5:34

== Charts ==
Chart (1994)	Peak position
Australia (ARIA)	71
Belgium (Ultratop 50 Flanders)	46
Europe (European Dance Radio)	20
Finland (Suomen virallinen lista)	16
Israel (Israeli Singles Chart)	21
Netherlands (Dutch Top 40)	38
Netherlands (Single Top 100)	31
New Zealand (Recorded Music NZ)	12
Scotland (OCC)	45
Sweden (Sverigetopplistan)	34
UK Singles (Official Charts)	21
UK Club Chart (Music Week)	95

== Release history ==
Region	Date	Format(s)	Label(s)	Ref.
Europe	11 April 1994	CD	Virgin	
United Kingdom	2 May 1994	7-inch vinyl; CD; cassette	Virgin	
Australia	6 June 1994	CD; cassette	Virgin	
