= MMX (The Social Song) =

Single by Enigma
- Released: 15 December 2010
- Recorded: 2010
- Genre: World, new-age, downtempo, chillout
- Length: 4:14
- Label: Virgin, EMI
- Songwriter(s): Alise Ketnere (Fox Lima); Jérôme Pringault (J. Spring); Mark Josher; Rasa Veretenčevienė (Rasa Serra)
- Producer(s): Michael Cretu

Enigma singles chronology
"The Same Parents" (2008)	"MMX (The Social Song)" (2010)	"Sadeness (Part II)" (2016)

Music video
- "MMX (The Social Song)" on YouTube

"MMX (The Social Song)" is a single by the band Enigma released on 15 December 2010 to celebrate the 20th anniversary of the musical project.

In October 2010 Enigma's producer Michael Cretu invited the fans to record themselves and vote for a vocalist to create the song via internet.

Latvian Fox Lima's (Alise Ketnere) "Fei Mea" was the most voted and became the lead vocal for the chorus of the social song.

The 3 runners up, J.Spring (Jerome Pringault) from Spain, Mark Josher from Brazil and Rasa Serra (Rasa Veretenčevienė) from Lithuania provided other important parts of the vocals like the backings, bridge and verse of the final version of the single.

All 4 vocalists are fully credited for the lyrics and music.

Fans were also involved in the production of the song choosing a solo instrument, its final style and mood as well as its cover art created by Lars Doerwald.

Finally Arístides Moreno (Steadycamline) was voted by the fans to direct the official video which was released on YouTube, Enigma's official website and Facebook on 17 March 2011.

Arístides Moreno (Steadycamline) also directed and edited a making-of video of the event.

"MMX" is the first track Michael recorded on his own in his mobile producing studio called Merlin, and it is also the first song ever created and produced via the internet exclusively for and by fans.

== Background ==
At the end of September 2010 Enigma's producer Michael Cretu officially announced a special event for the 20th anniversary of the project called "Enigma's Social Song" involving the fans all over the world.

The project was set up as an event "to commemorate Enigma's 20th anniversary involving fans actively in the process of creating a song together with Michael Cretu. For the first time ever he will allow people to look behind the scenes writing and producing along the preferences of the public. They will be engaged in original vocal submissions, series of votings and active participation. That's why we call it a "Social Song"."

Enigma's Social Song official website was also created.

The following 3 weeks hundreds of fans submitted and voted for their favorite vocals via YouTube. For the first two weeks of voting J. Spring's "Time Machine" was the fans favorite but Fox Lima's "Fei Mea" was eventually the most popular, and became the lead vocalist, closely followed by Mark Josher's "Set U Free", J. Spring's "Time Machine" and Rasa Serra's "Oi Giria Giria".

Following the release of the song, Fox Lima revealed that her lyrics for "Fei Mea" did not have a language but were, in fact, words and sounds that came to her while recording.

== Recording ==
After officially announcing the winner, Cretu formally invited and asked the 3 runners up: Mark Josher, J. Spring and Rasa Serra to record supporting/backing vocals for the song.

It was confirmed on Enigma's official Twitter that "Michael had received all the vocals from all the winning vocalists, that he was very pleased with their high quality and would use all of them in the final mix making it the first real and global social song".

Michael decided to use Fox Lima's lead vocals for the chorus recurrent in the final version.

J. Spring is the second vocalist to appear on the track with some hypnotic/tribal chanting and singing the word "to love" in French (aimer). He appears again later on in the song together with the solo instrument.

Rasa Serra comes in after the second and third chorus singing a traditional Lithuanian folklore song. She also closes the track.

Mark Josher provided the verse which is the only part of the single sung in English.

How Michael implemented each vocalist in the song was only revealed on the day of the official release of the single.

Another contest was set up on the official website for the fans to choose the style and overall mood of the song as well as a solo lead instrument. During the whole process of the production Michael kept posting short videos explaining the various phases of the track.

== Art cover contest & Final mix release ==
To add to the global spirit of the project Michael Cretu and the Enigma's team decided to involve fans further more and participate in another contest for the cover art of the single.

Michael named the 20th anniversary single "MMX - The Social Song" (MMX meaning "2010" in Roman numerals) referring to MCMXC a.D. (1990 in Roman numerals) to commemorate the initial success of the project. "Everything started with the first Enigma album, MCMXC a.D., in 1990. 20 years later I am proud that this musical journey turned out so great. The "Social Song" is something special… a sort of experiment that is a remembering of the past and an outlook of the future. I wanted both aspects being reflected in the name of the final song." Michael Cretu explains.

After more than 460 submissions, Lars Doerwald's creation for the cover art was the most voted."The cover fits perfectly to Enigma. It's weird and modern at the same time." Michael says. "Even though we had so many good creations, I am very happy with the result."

The final mix of the single was finally released on 15 December 2010 along with its front cover and a digital booklet.

== Official Video ==
On 24 January 2011 an ultimate event for the single was announced on the official website and a video contest was set up. As for the other stages fans were asked to submit a video for the single and vote for their favorite. "On December 15, 2010 we launched our final "MMX (The Social Song)" as a result of an amazing interactive fan event. We have so much enjoyed the last 3 months of collaboration and we got such a positive feedback that we decided to continue our journey. People have shown their talent in singing, designing covers, and creating a song together, but one thing is missing, though – the music video."

After a month of submissions and votes, Arístides Moreno (Steadycamline) was finally announced as the winner of the video contest and became its official director.

The edited and final version of the official "MMX" video was released on 17 March 2011 on YouTube and Enigma's various official websites.

Arístides Moreno (Steadycamline) also directed and edited a 30 minutes Making-of video of the event released on 30 May 2011.
