= Return to Innocence =

1993 single by Enigma

Single by Enigma

from the album The Cross of Changes
- Released: 13 December 1993
- Studio: A.R.T. (Ibiza, Spain)
- Genre: New-age; worldbeat
- Length: 4:03
- Label: Virgin
- Songwriters: Michael Cretu; Kuo Ying-nan; Kuo Hsiu-chu
- Producer: Michael Cretu

Enigma singles chronology
"Carly's Song" (1993)	"Return to Innocence" (1993)	"The Eyes of Truth" (1994)

Music video
- "Return to Innocence" on YouTube

"Return to Innocence" is a song by German musical group Enigma, released in December 1993 by Virgin Records as the lead single from the group's second album, The Cross of Changes (1993). It was co-written and produced by Michael Cretu.

The song reached number one in four countries and peaked at number three on the UK Singles Chart. "Return to Innocence" was the project's biggest hit in the United States, reaching number two on the Billboard Modern Rock Tracks chart and number four on the Billboard Hot 100. Julien Temple directed its accompanying music video. It was filmed in Málaga, Spain, depicting a man's life in reverse and received heavy rotation on European music channels.

== History ==
The song's melodic and talking vocals in English are provided by Angel X (Andreas Harde), and a short talking vocal by Sandra ("That's not the beginning of the end, that's the return to yourself, the return to innocence"), while an Amis chant ("Weeding and Paddyfield Song No. 1") sung by folk music duo Difang and Igay Duana opens the song and is repeated throughout. Hailing from Taiwan, these Amis musicians were in a cultural exchange program in Paris in 1988 when their performance of the song was recorded by the Maison des Cultures du Monde and later distributed on CD. The producer of Enigma, Michael Cretu, later obtained the CD and proceeded to sample it.

=== Legal dispute ===
In March 1998, Difang and Igay sued Cretu, Virgin Records and a number of recording companies for unauthorised use of their song without credit. The case was settled out of court for an undisclosed amount of money and "full attribution" to the Duanas "including liner notes on all future releases featuring the work". Cretu has stated that he had been led to believe that the recording was in the public domain and that he did not intentionally violate the Duanas' copyright.

== Music and production ==
"Return to Innocence"
A 31-second sample of the song's verse, which blends of worldbeat and new-age.

"Return to Innocence" is a worldbeat and new-age song,, strongly influenced by indigenous Taiwanese music. The song was composed by Michael Cretu (credited as Curly M.C.). The vocals on the song are performed by Andreas Harde and Sandra Cretu, while Jens Gad and Peter Cornelius played guitar. The non-lyrical vocals is performed by Difang Duana. The song was recorded at A.R.T. Studios at Ibiza, Spain, with additional engineering by Michael Cretu. In addition, the drum beat of the song was sampled from the Led Zeppelin song "When the Levee Breaks", played by John Bonham.

== Critical reception ==
Ned Raggett from AllMusic said that "Return to Innocence" is "not quite up there" with "Sadeness" in the popular culture in the US, "but almost inescapable elsewhere." Larry Flick from Billboard magazine wrote that Enigma "resurfaces with a far more accessible, but no less cool pop/hip-hop kicker". He explained, "The track's insistent beat is good bait for a song that is chock-full of unusual male chants and breathy female vamping. Somewhere between the two is an irresistible hook and melody that assures much-deserved success at both radio and club level." Troy J. Augusto from Cash Box noted, "Now, experts at the Virgin Records hitmaking laboratory have concocted a new, even more startling scenario: Enigma as hit song-makers! Wild, but true. The life's work of one Michael Cretu, a zealous Romanian attempting to go where no new age musician has gone before. Enigma is threatening to break free of the genre's tacky shackles, making the world safe for ambient artists everywhere." Dave Sholin from the Gavin Report called it "a haunting production that won't go by unnoticed".

Jonathan Riggs from Idolator commented, "If all of human existence across time were a movie, 'Return to Innocence' is the song that should play over the end credits." He added, "'Return to Innocence' was then and remains now universally epic, instantly recognizable, largely incomprehensible and endlessly moving. Like us. Like life." Alan Jones from Music Week described it as a "mysterious new collage of sounds" and "a haunting and well-constructed piece that sets ethnic-sounding emoting and softly spoken phrases against a dance beat and a swirl of soft synth sounds". He concluded, "Satisfying and unique." John Kilgo from The Network Forty deemed it a "melodramatic chant". Charles Aaron for Entertainment Weekly noted that "group mastermind Michael Cretu replaces his familiar monkish chants (1991's hit 'Sadeness') with aboriginal croons, but the entrancing, mid-tempo groove remains, along with loopy female whispers." James Hamilton from the Record Mirror Dance Update named it a "slinkily atmospheric rolling sombre 0-88-0bpm Euro smash" in his weekly dance column. Richard Paton from Toledo Blade wrote that the song "captures that melange of sounds, the intensity of the beat, and the wafting vocals and chant".

== Music video ==
English film, documentary and music video director Julien Temple directed the music video for "Return to Innocence", which was filmed in Málaga, Spain and depicts a man's life in reverse, starting with him dying and ending with his baptism as a baby. It received heavy rotation on music television channels such as MTV Europe and was A-listed on Germany's VIVA in February 1994, guaranteeing at least 30 plays a week. The clip was also added at The Box in the US.

== Track listings ==
- European CD single
- UK 7-inch and cassette single
- US and Australian cassette single
1. "Return to Innocence" (radio edit) – 4:03
2. "Return to Innocence" (380 Midnight mix) – 5:55
- UK and Australian CD single
- Japanese maxi-CD single
1. "Return to Innocence" (radio edit) – 4:03
2. "Return to Innocence" (Long & Alive version) – 7:07
3. "Return to Innocence" (380 Midnight mix) – 5:55
4. "Return to Innocence" (short radio edit) – 3:01
- UK and US 12-inch single

A1. "Return to Innocence" (380 Midnight mix) – 5:55
A2. "Return to Innocence" (radio edit) – 4:03
B1. "Return to Innocence" (Long & Alive version) – 7:07

- US maxi-CD single
1. "Return to Innocence" (radio edit) – 4:03
2. "Return to Innocence" (Long & Alive version) – 7:07
3. "Return to Innocence" (380 Midnight mix) – 5:55
4. "Return to Innocence" (short radio edit) – 3:01
5. "Sadeness (Part I)" (radio edit) – 4:17
- Japanese mini-CD single
1. "Return to Innocence"
2. "Age of Loneliness (Carly's Song)"

== Personnel ==
Personnel are adapted from Apple Music.

- Andreas Harde (credited as Angel) – vocals
- Sandra Cretu – vocals
- Michael Cretu (credited as Curly M.C.) – production and engineering
- Jens Gad – guitars
- Peter Cornelius – guitars

== Charts ==
=== Weekly charts ===
Weekly chart performance for "Return to Innocence"
Chart (1994)	Peak position
Australia (ARIA)	16
Austria (Ö3 Austria Top 40)	4
Belgium (Ultratop 50 Flanders)	16
Canada Top Singles (RPM)	4
Canada Dance/Urban (RPM)	7
Denmark (IFPI)	2
Europe (Eurochart Hot 100)	2
Europe (European AC Radio)	9
Europe (European Hit Radio)	3
Finland (Suomen virallinen lista)	6
France (SNEP)	11
Germany (GfK)	5
Iceland (Íslenski Listinn Topp 40)	3
Ireland (IRMA)	1
Israel (Israeli Singles Chart)	1
Italy (Musica e dischi)	14
Mexico (Notitas Musicales)	3
Netherlands (Dutch Top 40)	6
Netherlands (Single Top 100)	8
New Zealand (Recorded Music NZ)	5
Norway (VG-lista)	1
Quebec (ADISQ)	12
Scottish Singles Sales (Official Charts)	8
Sweden (Sverigetopplistan)	1
Switzerland (Schweizer Hitparade)	5
UK Singles (Official Charts)	3
UK Airplay (Music Week)	4
UK Dance (Music Week)	6
US Billboard Hot 100	4
US Adult Contemporary (Billboard)	40
US Modern Rock Tracks (Billboard)	2
US Top 40/Mainstream (Billboard)	6
US Top 40/Rhythm-Crossover (Billboard)	16
US Cash Box Top 100	5
Zimbabwe (ZIMA)	1

=== Year-end charts ===
Year-end chart performance for "Return to Innocence"
Chart (1994)	Position
Australia (ARIA)	84
Austria (Ö3 Austria Top 40)	20
Belgium (Ultratop)	80
Brazil (Mais Tocadas)	42
Canada Top Singles (RPM)	24
Europe (Eurochart Hot 100)	12
Europe (European Hit Radio)	11
France (SNEP)	46
Germany (Media Control)	23
Iceland (Íslenski Listinn Topp 40)	40
Israel (Israeli Singles Chart)	12
Netherlands (Dutch Top 40)	42
Netherlands (Single Top 100)	72
New Zealand (RIANZ)	35
Sweden (Topplistan)	8
Switzerland (Schweizer Hitparade)	8
UK Singles (OCC)	28
UK Airplay (Music Week)	22
US Billboard Hot 100	33
US Modern Rock Tracks (Billboard)	19
US Cash Box Top 100	33

== Certifications ==
Certifications and sales for "Return to Innocence"
Region	Certification	Certified units/sales
Germany (BVMI)	Gold	250,000^{^}
New Zealand (RMNZ)	Gold	5,000^{*}
New Zealand (RMNZ) digital	Gold	15,000^{‡}
Norway (IFPI Norway)	Gold	
United Kingdom (BPI)	Gold	400,000^{‡}
United States (RIAA)	Gold	500,000
^{*} Sales figures based on certification alone.^{^} Shipments figures based on certification alone.^{‡} Sales+streaming figures based on certification alone.

== Release history ==
Release dates and formats for "Return to Innocence"
Region	Date	Format(s)	Label(s)	Ref.
Europe	13 December 1993	CD	Virgin	
United Kingdom	17 January 1994	7-inch vinyl; 12-inch vinyl; CD; cassette	Virgin	
Australia	7 February 1994	CD1; cassette	Virgin	
Japan	16 February 1994	Maxi-CD	Virgin	
Australia	28 February 1994	CD2	Virgin	
Japan	7 December 1994	Mini-CD	Virgin	
