= Aquilo (band) =

English musical duo

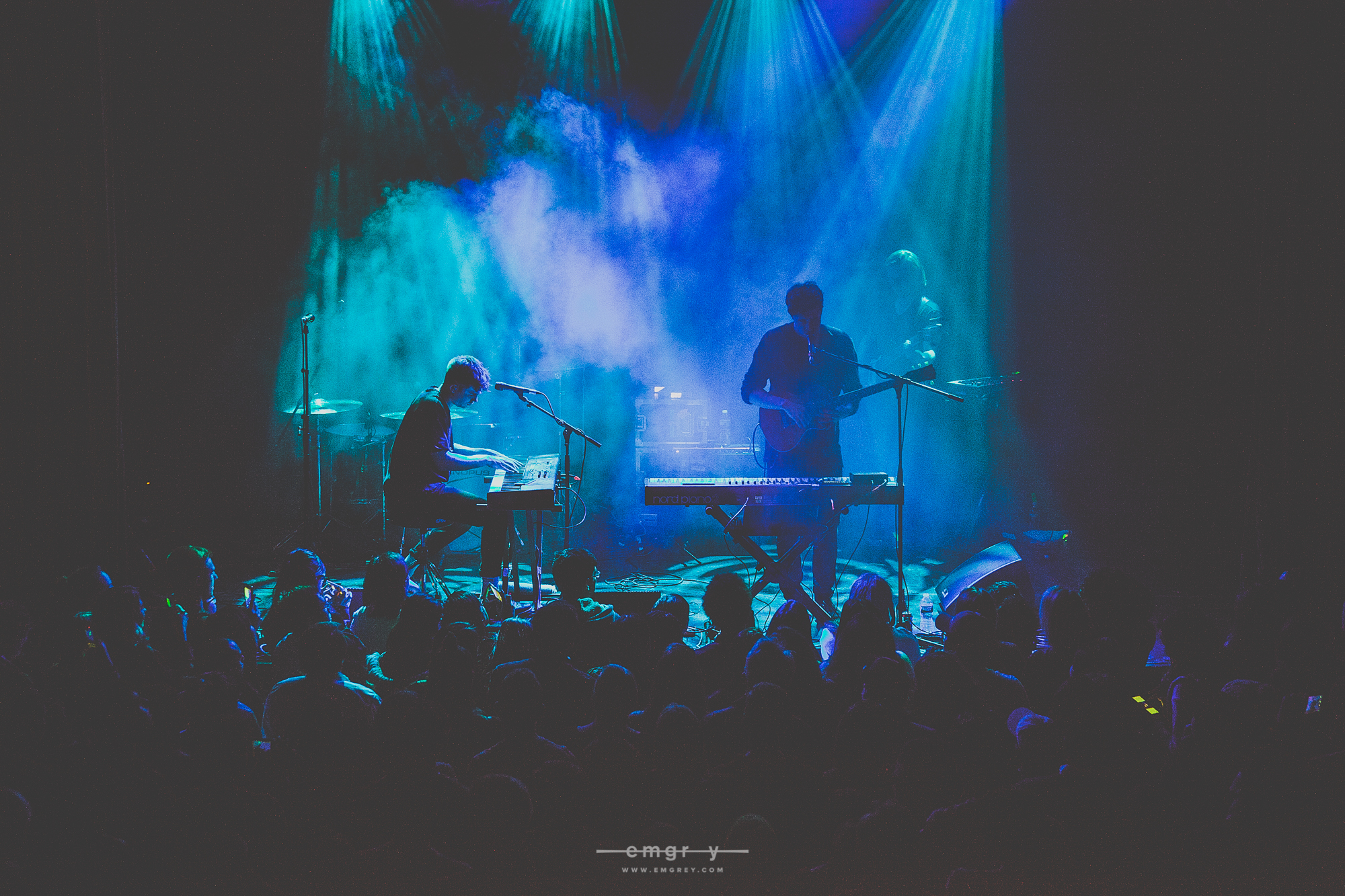

Background information
- Origin: Silverdale, Lancashire, England
- Genres: Electronic; dream pop; ambient
- Years active: 2013–present
- Labels: Believe; Island
- Members: Ben Fletcher; Tom Higham

Aquilo are an English musical duo from Silverdale, Lancashire, consisting of Tom Higham and Ben Fletcher. They began gaining recognition in 2013 for their singles such as "Calling Me" and "You There", in addition to their five EPs.

The duo's debut album, Silhouettes, was released on 27 January 2017. Their second studio album, ii, was released on 4 May 2018, and the third studio album A Safe Place To Be was released on 15 October 2021.

== History ==
=== Career beginnings ===
Members Tom Higham and Ben Fletcher grew up as neighbours in Silverdale, Lancashire. They were both part of rivaling rock bands in their hometown. Higham studied music production in university. The two worked on their musical projects individually before collaborating as Aquilo.

=== 2013–present: Aquilo, Human, and Calling Me ===
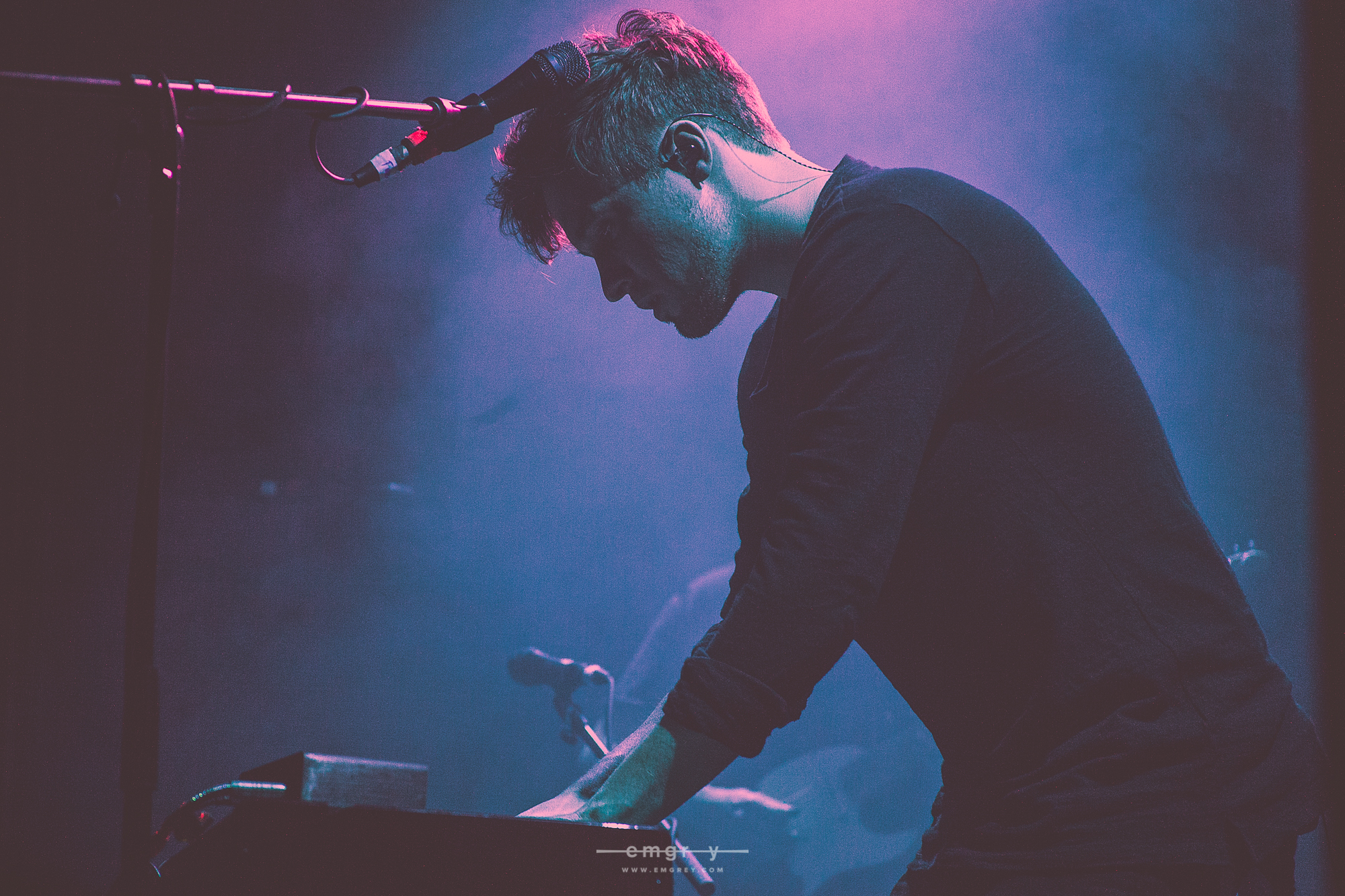
Tom Higham

Aquilo began receiving attention in 2013 for their debut tracks "You There" and "Calling Me". "You There" was included in BBC Radio 1's playlist on 12 June 2014 and the "Best Of BBC Introducing Stage" choices. The song was also featured in the trailer for the 2014 independent drama Camp X-Ray. Additionally, they performed "Calling Me" and "You There" on the BBC Introducing stage at the 2014 Glastonbury Festival 2014 on 28 June 2014. They also played at the 2014 Kendal Calling festival. Their first EP, Aquilo, was released on 3 March 2014.

On 8 December 2014, they released their second EP, Human.

On 5 March 2015, their collaboration with popular disc jockey Vanic, "Losing You", was released onto YouTube and SoundCloud. It has so far accumulated over 7.5 million 'plays' on SoundCloud as of 10 April 2017. They also collaborated with French DJ and record producer Madeon on "Innocence" from his debut album, Adventure, on 27 March. Besides collaborations, their third EP, Calling Me, was released at the start of June that year. Another EP, Painting Picture Of A War, was later released on 4 December.

On March 17th 2016, they played alongside alt-pop duo Oh Wonder, at O2 Forum Kentish Town, London.

In November 2016, the band appeared on Enigma's eighth studio album The Fall of a Rebel Angel. They provided vocals to the album's closing track and second single, respectively, "Amen".

On 27 January 2017, the duo released their debut album, Silhouettes. Their second studio album, ii, was released on 4 May 2018.

== Musical style ==
Aquilo's music have been described mainly as alternative, as well as electronica, dream pop, ambient and indie. They are known for producing "soft, calm electro-pop", "chilled electronic", "ravishingly refined sort of dreamily sad electronica", and "fragile dream pop laced with subtle electronica and soulful vocals."

== Discography ==
=== Albums ===
List of studio albums, with selected chart positions
Title	Album details			Peak chart positions
Title	Release date	Label	Format	UK Update
Silhouettes	27 January 2017	Island	CD Digital download	64
ii	4 May 2018	Island	CD Digital download	–
A Safe Place To Be	15 October 2021	AWAL	CD Digital download	–
A Quiet Invitation To a Hard Conversation	9 August 2024	AWAL	LP Digital download	–
You Should Get Some Sleep	6 December 2024	AWAL	LP Digital download	–

=== EPs ===
Title	Details		
Title	Release date	Label	Format
Aquilo	3 March 2014	Believe	Digital download
Human	8 December 2014	Island	Digital download 12"
Calling Me	1 June 2015	Island	Digital download 12"
Painting Pictures of a War	4 December 2015	Island	Digital download 12"
Midnight (Live)	29 January 2016	Island	Digital download 12"
In the Low Light (Live)	5 May 2017	Island	Digital download
ii (Side A)	17 November 2017	Island	Digital download
Sober	8 July 2020	AWAL	Digital download 12"
Even if the world don't understand you	19 July 2024	AWAL	Digital download
Confetti	29 May 2026		Digital download

=== Singles ===
- "You There" (2014)
- "It All Comes Down To This" (2014)
- "I Gave It All" (2014)
- "Losing You" (2014)
- "Calling Me" (2015)
- "Good Girl" (2015)
- "Sorry" (2016)
- "So Close to Magic" (2016)
- "Amen" (2016)
- "You Won't Know Where You Stand" (2017)
- "Silhouette" (2017)
- "Almost Over" (2017)
- "I Could Fight on a Wall" (2017)
- "Thin" (2017)
- "Who Are You" (2017)
- "Silent Movies" (2018)
- "Seagull" (2018)
- "Sober" (2020)
- "Just Asking" (2020)
- "Always Forever" (2020)
- "Moving On" (2020)
- "Missing the Mark" (2020)
- "Out in LA" (2021)
- "Our Bones Turn To Stone" (2021)
- "I Wanna See You Smile" (2021)
- "Painkiller" (2024)
- "Under My Skin" (2026)
- "Almost Had You" (2026)
