= Le Roi Est Mort, Vive Le Roi! =

1996 studio album by Enigma

Studio album by Enigma
- Released: 22 November 1996
- Recorded: 1996
- Studios: A.R.T. (Ibiza, Spain)
- Genres: New-age; ambient
- Length: 45:32
- Label: Virgin
- Producer: Curly M.C.

Enigma chronology
The Cross of Changes (1993)	Le Roi Est Mort, Vive Le Roi! (1996)	Trilogy (1998)

Singles from Le Roi Est Mort, Vive Le Roi!
- 1. "Beyond the Invisible" Released: 21 October 1996; 2. "T.N.T. for the Brain" Released: 17 February 1997

Le Roi Est Mort, Vive Le Roi! (French for "The King Is Dead, Long Live The King!") is the third studio album by German musical project Enigma, released on 22 November 1996 by Virgin Records.

== Background and release ==
The album continued Enigma's trend, giving it a slightly more modern, futuristic sound by combining the elements of Enigma's first album, MCMXC a.D., and their second album, The Cross of Changes. Michael Cretu, producer of the project, considered Le Roi Est Mort, Vive Le Roi! to be the child of the previous two albums, with the first being the father and the second being the mother, as indicated by the 19‑second track "Third of Its Kind". There are two editions of the packaging; one with standard paper artwork, and another with translucent tray and booklet artwork printed on a heavier plastic.

Le Roi Est Mort, Vive Le Roi! was nominated for Best New Age Album at the 1998 Grammy Awards, while Johann Zambryski's album art design earned him a nomination for Best Recording Package.

The intro track begins with a sample of mission control contacting the Discovery from the film 2001: A Space Odyssey. The intro, including the famed "Enigma horn", is played backwards for the closing track, "Odyssey of the Mind". The track "T.N.T. for the Brain" contains samples taken from Jeff Wayne's Musical Version of The War of the Worlds. The samples are just audible, underlying the main music. They can be most clearly heard at the start and the end of the track, but are just noticeable throughout. The track "Prism of Life" appears at the end credit of the 2023 documentary "Close Encounters of The Fifth Kind".

== Critical reception ==
Professional ratings
Review scores
Source	Rating
AllMusic	2.5/5 stars
Entertainment Weekly	D+
The Guardian	3/5 stars
Muzik	2/5 stars

Rick Anderson of AllMusic stated that "[Michael Cretu, as Enigma] doesn't seem to have done much to expand upon his original ideas", and despite reserving praise for the "darkly lovely" "The Child in Us", dismissed most of the album as "twaddle" and "disappointing". The site gave the album two and a half stars out of five. Tracey Pepper of Entertainment Weekly summarised the album as "another synthesizer-heavy mix of Gregorian chants, moody atmospherics, lyrics rife with existential platitudes, and well-trodden '90s dance rhythms", writing, "It sounded okay in 1990, but now it's just embarrassing."

== Commercial performance ==
The album reached to the top spot in Norway and the top five in Austria, Finland, Germany and Switzerland. It spawned two singles, "Beyond the Invisible" and "T.N.T. for the Brain". A planned third single, "The Roundabout", was scrapped at the last minute for unclear reasons, even though a remix had already been created by DJ Quicksilver.

== Track listing ==
All tracks are written by Michael Cretu, except where noted.

No.	Title	Lyrics	Length
1.	"Le Roi Est Mort, Vive Le Roi!"		1:57
2.	"Morphing Thru Time"		5:47
3.	"Third of Its Kind"		0:19
4.	"Beyond the Invisible"	Cretu; David Fairstein	5:00
5.	"Why! ..."		4:59
6.	"Shadows in Silence"		4:21
7.	"The Child in Us"		5:05
8.	"T.N.T. for the Brain"		4:26
9.	"Almost Full Moon"		3:25
10.	"The Roundabout"	Cretu; Fairstein	3:38
11.	"Prism of Life"	Cretu; Fairstein	4:54
12.	"Odyssey of the Mind"		1:41
Total length:			45:32

== Personnel ==
Credits adapted from the liner notes of Le Roi Est Mort, Vive Le Roi!

- Dr. Bhagya Murthy – Sanskrit chant
- Sandra Cretu – female voices
- Louisa Stanley – female voices
- Peter Cornelius – guitars on "The Child In Us"
- Michael Cretu – vocals, instruments, production, engineering
- Johann Zambryski – art direction, design
- Volker Sträter – illustrations

== Charts ==
=== Weekly charts ===
Weekly chart performance
Chart (1996–1997)	Peak position
Australian Albums (ARIA)	10
Austrian Albums (Ö3 Austria)	4
Belgian Albums (Ultratop Wallonia)	30
Canada Top Albums/CDs (RPM)	11
Danish Albums (Hitlisten)	6
Dutch Albums (Album Top 100)	6
European Albums (Music & Media)	3
Finnish Albums (Suomen virallinen lista)	4
French Albums (SNEP)	8
German Albums (Offizielle Top 100)	3
Hungarian Albums (MAHASZ)	11
New Zealand Albums (RMNZ)	8
Norwegian Albums (VG-lista)	1
Portuguese Albums (AFP)	6
Scottish Albums (Official Charts)	40
Spanish Albums (AFYVE)	18
Swedish Albums (Sverigetopplistan)	8
Swiss Albums (Schweizer Hitparade)	4
UK Albums (Official Charts)	12
US Billboard 200	25

=== Year-end charts ===
1996 year-end chart performance
Chart (1996)	Position
Australian Albums (ARIA)	99
Norwegian Albums (VG-lista)	19
Swedish Albums & Compilations (Sverigetopplistan)	62
UK Albums (OCC)	84

1997 year-end chart performance
Chart (1997)	Position
Dutch Albums (Album Top 100)	46
European Albums (Music & Media)	67
German Albums (Offizielle Top 100)	86
US Billboard 200	91

== Certifications ==
Certifications for Le Roi Est Mort, Vive Le Roi!
Region	Certification	Certified units/sales
Australia (ARIA)	Gold	35,000^{^}
Austria (IFPI Austria)	Gold	25,000^{*}
Canada (Music Canada)	Platinum	100,000^{^}
Finland (Musiikkituottajat)	Gold	21,236
France (SNEP)	Gold	100,000^{*}
Germany (BVMI)	Gold	250,000^{^}
Hong Kong (IFPI Hong Kong)	Gold	10,000^{*}
Netherlands (NVPI)	Platinum	100,000^{^}
New Zealand (RMNZ)	Platinum	15,000^{^}
Norway (IFPI Norway)	Platinum	50,000^{*}
Poland (ZPAV)	Gold	50,000^{*}
Spain (Promusicae)	Gold	50,000^{^}
Switzerland (IFPI Switzerland)	Gold	25,000^{^}
United Kingdom (BPI)	Gold	100,000^{^}
United States (RIAA)	Platinum	1,000,000^{^}
^{*} Sales figures based on certification alone.^{^} Shipments figures based on certification alone.
