= Seven Lives Many Faces =

2008 studio album by Enigma

Studio album by Enigma
- Released: 19 September 2008
- Recorded: 2007–2008
- Studio: Various places with the "Alchemist" (all in one computed mobile studio)
- Genre: New age; pop; electronica; downtempo; synth-pop
- Length: 50:01
- Label: Virgin
- Producer: Michael Cretu

Enigma chronology
A Posteriori (2006)	Seven Lives Many Faces (2008)	The Platinum Collection (2009)

Seven Lives Many Faces is the seventh studio album by the German musical project Enigma, released on 19 September 2008 by Virgin Records. Michael Cretu stated that the album would feature an omnicultural sound unlike anything on its previous releases. On 12 September, the album was released on Enigma's Myspace page for pre-listening. After enjoying a huge success on MySpace (with over 400,000 listens in two days), several international MTV and VH1 websites started streaming the album until 22 September.

Seven Lives Many Faces was also released in DVD format with 5.1 surround sound, similar to their previous album A Posteriori.

== Singles ==
The first two singles from the album are "Seven Lives" and "La Puerta del Cielo". The videos for each song use scenes from previous Enigma videos, "Push the Limits" for "Seven Lives" and "Age of Loneliness" for "La Puerta del Cielo". "The Same Parents" was released as the third single off the album. The lyrics of the song "La Puerta del Cielo" (The Gate of Heaven), although with a Spanish title, are in Catalan language. The other song of the album written in Catalan is "Between Generations". Both songs were co-written by Michael Cretu and Margalida Roig.

== Critical reception ==
Professional ratings
Review scores
Source	Rating
AllMusic	3/5 stars

AllMusic's James Christopher Monger gave the album three stars out of five. While he praised the singles "Seven Lives" and "La Puerta del Cielo" calling them "quietly stunning", he found that in most cases "the new age, fortune-cookie derived lyrics... mirror the unimaginative, two-chord melodies that carry them along."

== Commercial performance ==
The album debuted at No. 92 on the Billboard 200, and No. 1 on the New Age Albums, selling 6,000 copies in the first week. The album had sold 85,000 copies in the United States as of September 2016.

== Track listing ==
No.	Title	Writer(s)	Length
1.	"Encounters"	Michael Cretu	3:12
2.	"Seven Lives"	Cretu	4:25
3.	"Touchness"	Cretu	3:35
4.	"The Same Parents"	Cretu	5:19
5.	"Fata Morgana"	Cretu	3:23
6.	"Hell's Heaven"	Cretu	3:51
7.	"La Puerta del Cielo"	Cretu, Margarita Roig	3:28
8.	"Distorted Love"	Cretu, Andru Donalds	4:11
9.	"Je t'aime Till My Dying Day"	Cretu, Donalds	4:18
10.	"Déjà Vu"	Cretu	2:56
11.	"Between Generations"	Cretu, Roig	4:31
12.	"The Language of Sound"	Cretu	4:20
Total length:			50:01

Pre-orders exclusive tracks (German iTunes)
No.	Title	Length
13.	"Comments on the Album Title"	0:46
14.	"Comments to "Seven Lives""	0:40
15.	"Comments to "Touchness""	0:39
16.	"Comments to "The Same Parents""	0:54
17.	"Comments to "Fata Morgana""	0:43
18.	"Comments to "Hell’s Heaven""	0:32
19.	"Comments to "La Puerta del Cielo""	0:59
20.	"Comments to "Distorted Love""	1:00
21.	"Comments to "Je t’aime Till My Dying Day""	0:40
22.	"Comments to "Déjà vu""	0:40
23.	"Comments to "Between Generations""	0:53
24.	"Comments to "The Language of Sound""	0:45
25.	"Where Are We from"	1:34

Japanese edition bonus track
No.	Title	Length
13.	"Epilogue"	1:57

Bonus disc
No.	Title	Length
1.	"Superficial"	2:58
2.	"We Are Nature"	3:51
3.	"Downtown Silence"	2:08
4.	"Sunrise"	2:38
5.	"The Language of Sound" (slow edit)	3:56
Total length:		15:31

== Personnel ==
- Michael Cretu – music, lyrics, performance, production, programming, arrangements, engineering
- Andru Donalds – vocals (tracks: 2, 4, 8, 9), co-writer (tracks: 8, 9)
- Nanuk – vocals (track: 4), narration (track: 9)
- Nikita C. – vocals (track: 4)
- Sebastian C. – vocals (track: 4)
- Margarita Roig – vocals (tracks: 7, 11, 2 (Bonus CD)), co-writer (tracks: 7, 11)
- Ruth-Ann Boyle – vocals (tracks 3, 5, 2 (Bonus CD))

Additional personnel

- Rosemary Robenn – photography
- Dirk Rudolph – artwork

== Charts ==
=== Weekly charts ===
Weekly chart performance for Seven Lives Many Faces
Chart (2008)	Peak position
Austrian Albums (Ö3 Austria)	30
Belgian Albums (Ultratop Flanders)	52
Belgian Albums (Ultratop Wallonia)	42
Czech Albums (ČNS IFPI)	10
Dutch Albums (Album Top 100)	22
French Albums (SNEP)	93
German Albums (Offizielle Top 100)	15
Hungarian Albums (MAHASZ)	22
Italian Albums (FIMI)	36
Japanese Albums (Oricon)	181
Mexican Albums (Top 100 Mexico)	59
Polish Albums (ZPAV)	48
Portuguese Albums (AFP)	29
Russian Albums (2M)	10
Spanish Albums (Promusicae)	75
Swiss Albums (Schweizer Hitparade)	18
UK Albums (OCC)	116
US Billboard 200	92
US New Age Albums (Billboard)	1

=== Year-end charts ===
2008 year-end chart performance for Seven Lives Many Faces
Chart (2008)	Position
US New Age Albums (Billboard)	8

2009 year-end chart performance for Seven Lives Many Faces
Chart (2009)	Position
US New Age Albums (Billboard)	6

2010 year-end chart performance for Seven Lives Many Faces
Chart (2010)	Position
US New Age Albums (Billboard)	10

== Certifications ==
Certifications for Seven Lives Many Faces
Region	Certification	Certified units/sales
GCC (IFPI Middle East)	Gold	3,000^{*}
Russia (NFPF)	Gold	10,000^{*}
^{*} Sales figures based on certification alone.

== Release history ==
Region	Date
Worldwide	19 September 2008
North America	30 September 2008
