= La Puerta del Cielo / Seven Lives =

Single by Enigma

from the album Seven Lives Many Faces
- Released: 8 August 2008 (Digital download); 15 August 2008 (CD single)
- Recorded: 2007–2008
- Genre: New-age, hip-hop
- Length: 7:17
- Label: Virgin / EMI

Enigma singles chronology
"Eppur Si Muove" (2006)	"La Puerta del Cielo / Seven Lives" (2008)	"The Same Parents" (2008)

Music video
- "La Puerta del Cielo" on YouTube

Music video
- "Seven Lives" on YouTube

"La Puerta del Cielo / Seven Lives" is the first single from Enigma's seventh album Seven Lives Many Faces.

== Overview ==
The track "Seven Lives" had been featured on German TV as the signature theme to the public broadcaster EinsFestival's coverage of the 2008 Summer Olympics in Beijing. The single was digitally released in Germany on 8 August and physically on 15 August. The single reached top 50 in Germany and remained in the top 100 for several weeks. "Seven Lives" was featured in the well-known Norwegian game Kahoot! as part of the soundtrack. Cretu was uncredited for it.

The title of the song "La Puerta del Cielo" (The Gate of Heaven) is in Spanish but its lyrics are in Catalan: Allà dins es canal / En es peu da sa muntanya. The other song that has Catalan words is "Between Generations". Both songs are co-written by Michael Cretu and Margalida Roig.

== Single track listing ==
1. "La Puerta del Cielo (Radio Edit)" – 3:31
2. "Seven Lives (Radio Edit)" – 3:46
