= Out from the Deep =

Single by Enigma

from the album The Cross of Changes
- Released: 1994
- Recorded: 1993
- Studio: A.R.T. Studios, Ibiza
- Genre: New age, rock
- Length: 4:27
- Label: Virgin / EMI
- Songwriter: Michael Cretu
- Producer: Michael Cretu

Enigma singles chronology
"Age of Loneliness" (1994)	"Out from the Deep" (1994)	"Beyond the Invisible" (1996)

Music video
- "Out from the Deep" on YouTube

"Out from the Deep" is a 1994 song created by the German electronic band Enigma. This single is the fourth and last single released from the band's second album, The Cross of Changes. The single cover art is a simplified version of The Cross of Changes.

The song employs a more traditional rock format compared to Enigma's hallmark electronica sound. The song contains a sample from A Positive Life's "The Calling". Michael Cretu provides vocals here.

The lyrics of the second verse are the same as the ones of The Cross of Changes' opening track Second Chapter.

The video was shot and produced in London; diving equipment supply, supervision and dressing was provided by Michael Last and Jeff Grey.

== Music video ==
In the music video for the song, helmed by Venezuelan director Angel Gracia (who, in tandem with Cliff Guest, won MTV's Make My Video competition for Madonna's "True Blue" song in 1986), a diver comes upon an Atlantis-like submerged ancient city (underscored by sound effects resembling a sonar's echo) and takes a tour around the city, similar to the video clip for "Sadeness (Part I)". Soon he realizes he can breathe without the scaphander, and is attracted by a series of lively murals (paintings or mosaics) combining Pompeii and Byzantine features. Eventually driven to try to make contact with a woman of strange beauty, as their fingertips touch, all the figures come alive resuming what presumably were their last actions. But so does the being responsible for the city's doom - a Poseidon reminiscent of the Sistine Chapel's angry Jehovah - reenacting the catastrophe and the spell. All of the newly liberated beings return to their mural condition. Sadly enough, the spell also befalls the diver - which admits, however, a glimpse of hope: the figures are now in slightly different positions as a consequence of their progress during their brief period of freedom, and the intrepid diver has left his imperishable mark, as a mural in his likeness - the background music featuring, for a last time, the chorus: That's why we are here.

== Track listing ==
1. Radio Edit – 4:27
2. Rock Version – 6:44
3. Trance Mix (168 bpm) – 5:49
4. Short Radio Edit – 3:30

== Charts ==
Chart (1995)	Peak position
Australia (ARIA)	109
