= The Cross of Changes =

1993 studio album by Enigma

Studio album by Enigma
- Released: 6 December 1993
- Studios: A.R.T. (Ibiza, Spain)
- Genres: New-age; ambient; worldbeat
- Length: 44:12
- Label: Virgin
- Producer: Michael Cretu

Enigma chronology
| MCMXC a.D. (1990) | The Cross of Changes (1993) | Le Roi Est Mort, Vive Le Roi! (1996) |

Singles from The Cross of Changes
- 1. "Return to Innocence" Released: 13 December 1993; 2. "The Eyes of Truth" Released: 11 April 1994; 3. "Age of Loneliness" Released: 8 August 1994; 4. "Out from the Deep" Released: 1994

Professional ratings
Review scores
| Source | Rating |
|---|---|
| AllMusic | 4/5 stars |
| Billboard | (favorable) |
| Bravo | 5/5 stars |
| Entertainment Weekly | B |
| Los Angeles Times | 1.5/4 stars |
| Music Week | 4/5 stars |
| The Great Rock Discography | 5/10 |

The Cross of Changes is the second studio album by the German musical project Enigma, headed by Romanian-German musician and producer Michael Cretu, released on 6 December 1993 by Virgin Records internationally and by Charisma Records in the United States.

Following the worldwide commercial success of the first Enigma album, MCMXC a.D. (1990), Cretu began to write and record music for a new album at A.R.T. Studios, his home studio in Ibiza, Spain. Cretu sampled songs from several artists, including Vangelis, U2, Genesis and Black Sabbath.

The Cross of Changes was a commercial success. Upon its release, it debuted at No. 1 on the UK Albums Chart, becoming Enigma's second consecutive number-one album in the United Kingdom, and peaked at number nine on the Billboard 200 in the United States, where it sold over two million copies. In 1994, four singles were released from the album: "Return to Innocence", "The Eyes of Truth", "Age of Loneliness (Carly's Song)" (originally written for the film Sliver), and "Out from the Deep". A special limited edition of the album was released on 21 November 1994 on a 24-carat gold-plated disc, containing three additional remixes.

== Critical reception ==
Larry Flick from Billboard magazine praised The Cross of Changes as "a stunning, mind-expanding collection of chill-out/ambient dance jams. Producer Michael Cretu, who started the act's multiformat fire at club level with 'Sadeness', has clearly topped himself with complex, vividly cinematic compositions like the sprawling first single, 'Return to Innocence', and 'I Love You, I'll Kill You'. Weighting in without a jam above 98 beats per minute, this is sustenance for the adventurous, intelligent programmer."

== Track listing ==
All lyrics are written by Curly M.C., except where noted.

| No. | Title | Lyrics | Length |
|---|---|---|---|
| 1. | "Second Chapter" | | 2:16 |
| 2. | "The Eyes of Truth" | | 7:13 |
| 3. | "Return to Innocence" | Curly M.C.; Kuo Ying-nan; Kuo Hsiu-chu | 4:17 |
| 4. | "I Love You ... I'll Kill You" | David Fairstein; Curly M.C. | 8:51 |
| 5. | "Silent Warrior" | | 6:10 |
| 6. | "The Dream of the Dolphin" | Fairstein | 2:47 |
| 7. | "Age of Loneliness (Carly's Song)" | | 5:22 |
| 8. | "Out from the Deep" | | 4:53 |
| 9. | "The Cross of Changes" | | 2:23 |
| Total length: | | | 44:12 |

1994 special limited edition bonus tracks
| No. | Title | Length |
|---|---|---|
| 10. | "Return to Innocence" (Long & Alive Version) | 7:07 |
| 11. | "Age of Loneliness" (Enigmatic Club Mix) | 6:23 |
| 12. | "The Eyes of Truth" (The Götterdämmerung Mix) | 7:18 |

== Personnel ==
Credits adapted from the liner notes of The Cross of Changes.

- Andreas Harde (credited as Angel) – additional voice
- Sandra Cretu – additional voice
- Michael Cretu (credited as Curly M.C.) – additional voice, instruments, programming, production, engineering
- Louisa Stanley – additional voice
- Jens Gad – guitars
- Peter Cornelius – guitars

== Derivative works ==
1. "Return to innocence" has been sampled by Aura Dione in her track "Where Does Love Go?"

== Charts ==
=== Weekly charts ===
Weekly chart performance for The Cross of Changes
| Chart (1994) | Peak position |
|---|---|
| Australian Albums (ARIA) | 2 |
| Austrian Albums (Ö3 Austria) | 5 |
| Canada Top Albums/CDs (RPM) | 4 |
| Danish Albums (Hitlisten) | 1 |
| Dutch Albums (Album Top 100) | 7 |
| European Albums (Music & Media) | 2 |
| Finnish Albums (Suomen virallinen lista) | 2 |
| German Albums (Offizielle Top 100) | 5 |
| Hungarian Albums (MAHASZ) | 10 |
| Irish Albums (IFPI) | 2 |
| New Zealand Albums (RMNZ) | 1 |
| Norwegian Albums (VG-lista) | 5 |
| Portuguese Albums (AFP) | 2 |
| Spanish Albums (AFYVE) | 6 |
| Swedish Albums (Sverigetopplistan) | 3 |
| Swiss Albums (Schweizer Hitparade) | 4 |
| UK Albums (Official Charts) | 1 |
| US Billboard 200 | 9 |

=== Year-end charts ===
Year-end chart performance for The Cross of Changes
| Chart (1994) | Position |
|---|---|
| Australian Albums (ARIA) | 33 |
| Austrian Albums (Ö3 Austria) | 21 |
| Canada Top Albums/CDs (RPM) | 9 |
| Dutch Albums (Album Top 100) | 37 |
| European Albums (Music & Media) | 6 |
| German Albums (Offizielle Top 100) | 20 |
| New Zealand Albums (RMNZ) | 6 |
| Swiss Albums (Schweizer Hitparade) | 11 |
| UK Albums (OCC) | 14 |
| US Billboard 200 | 42 |

== Certifications and sales ==
Certifications and sales for The Cross of Changes
| Region | Certification | Certified units/sales |
|---|---|---|
| Australia (ARIA) | 2× Platinum | 140,000^{^} |
| Austria (IFPI Austria) | Gold | 25,000^{*} |
| Canada (Music Canada) | 2× Platinum | 200,000^{^} |
| France (SNEP) | Gold | 100,000^{*} |
| Germany (BVMI) | Platinum | 500,000^{^} |
| Netherlands (NVPI) | Gold | 50,000^{^} |
| Norway (IFPI Norway) | Platinum | 50,000^{*} |
| Spain (Promusicae) | Platinum | 100,000^{^} |
| Sweden (GLF) | Gold | 50,000^{^} |
| Switzerland (IFPI Switzerland) | Platinum | 50,000^{^} |
| United Kingdom (BPI) | 2× Platinum | 600,000^{^} |
| United States (RIAA) | 2× Platinum | 2,000,000^{^} |
Summaries
| Europe (IFPI) | Platinum | 1,000,000^{*} |
| Worldwide | — | 8,000,000 |
^{*} Sales figures based on certification alone.^{^} Shipments figures based on certification alone.
