= Peter Cornelius (singer-songwriter) =

Austrian musician (born 1951)

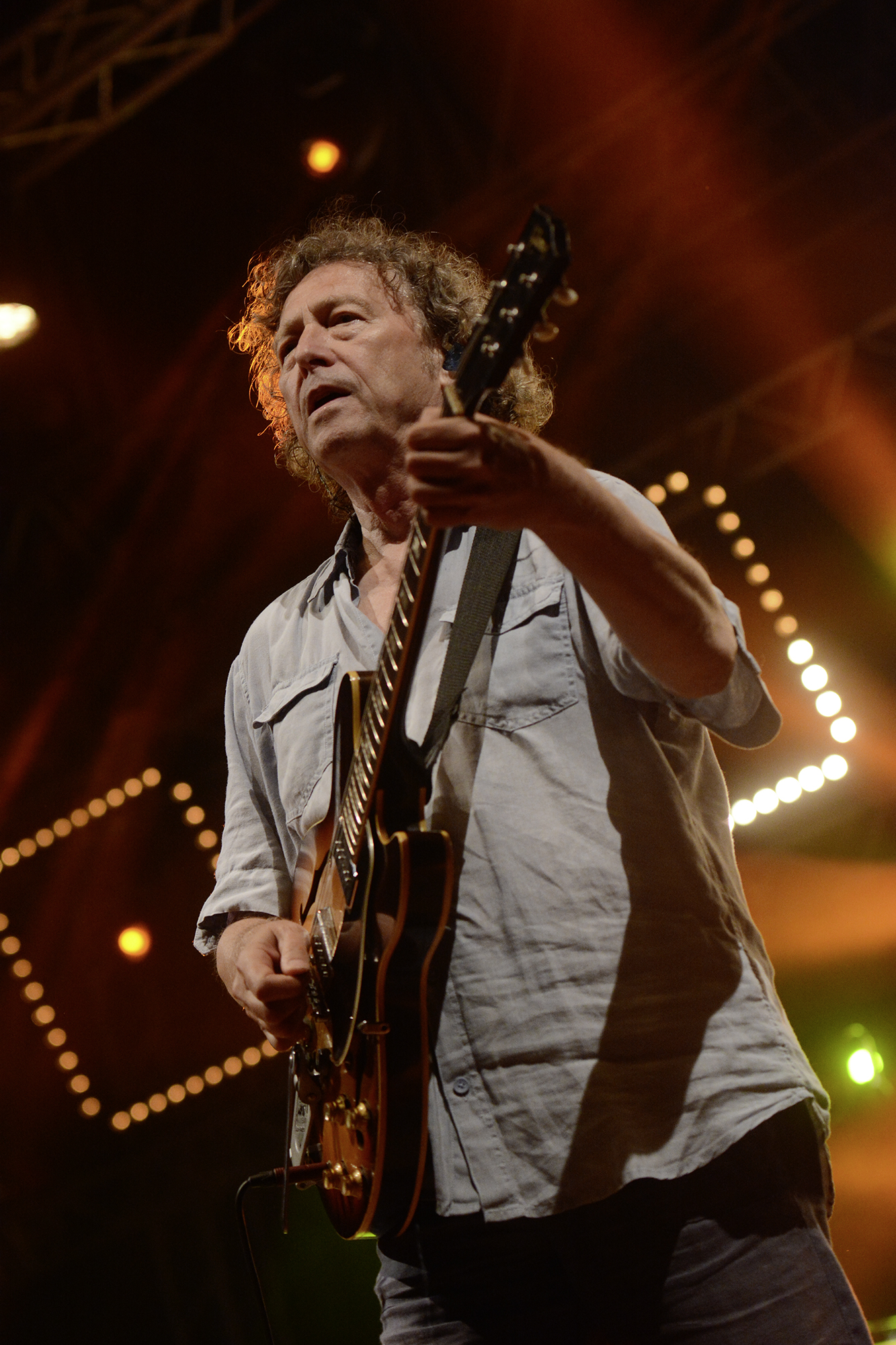
Peter Cornelius (2015)

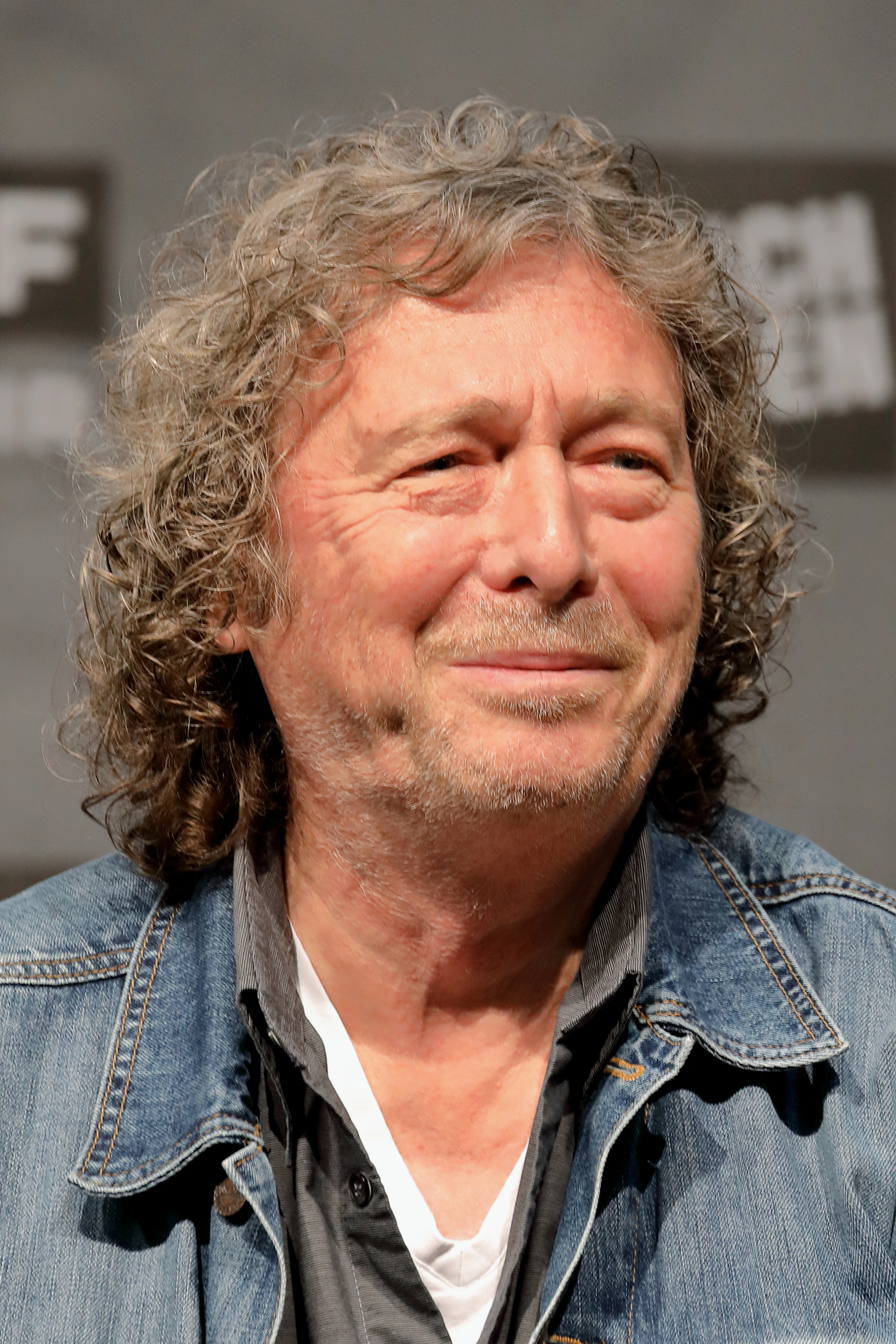
Peter Cornelius (2018)

Peter Cornelius (born 29 January 1951 in Vienna as Peter Cornelius Korunka) is an Austrian singer-songwriter of Austropop, guitarist, and a former member of Enigma.

== Discography ==
=== Albums ===
- 1974 Hampelmann
- 1974 Fleckerlteppich
- 1976 Eine Rose aus Papier
- 1980 Der Kaffee ist fertig
- 1980 Zwei
- 1981 Reif für die Insel
- 1982 Bevor i geh' / Ohne Filter
- 1983 Fata Morgana
- 1984 Süchtig
- 1986 Gegen den Strom
- 1987 CORNELIUS '87
- 1988 Sensibel
- 1989 Jahreszeiten
- 1989 Live aus dem Wiener Konzerthaus
- 1990 In Bewegung
- 1992 Cornelius + Cretu
- 1993 Lieber heut als morgen
- 2001 Lebenszeichen
- 2003 Schatten und Licht
- 2006 Wie ein Junger Hund im hohen Gras
- 2008 Handschrift
- 2012 12 neue 12
- 2017 Unverwüstlich
- 2019 Liebeslieder
- 2021 Tageslicht
- 2026 Glassplitter

=== DVDs ===
- December 2006: Peter Cornelius: Live vor 100.000 auf dem Donauinselfest

=== Compilations ===
- 1984 Streicheleinheiten
- 1987 Meine grossen Erfolge
- 1988 Liederbuch
- 1988 Portrait
- 1989 Poptakes
- 1989 Instrumental
- 1990 Sehnsucht
- 1992 Streicheleinheiten
- 1995 Meisterstücke
- 1995 Song Portrait
- 1996 Liedermacher
- 1997 Die grössten Hits aus 25 Jahren
- 1998 Master Series
- 1999 Schwerelos (box set)
- 2001 Best of Peter Cornelius
- 2004 Peter Cornelius – Das Beste
- 2006 Peter Cornelius – Best of – Reif für die Insel (disc 1 of 3)
- 2015 Peter Cornelius – Best of – 36 grosse Songs
