= Age of Loneliness =

1994 single by Enigma

Single by Enigma

from the album The Cross of Changes
- B-side: "Principles of Lust"
- Released: 8 August 1994
- Genre: New age; pop; trance
- Length: 5:22
- Label: Virgin
- Songwriters: Jeremy Coleman; Michael Cretu; Anne Dudley
- Producer: Michael Cretu

Enigma singles chronology
"The Eyes of Truth" (1994)	"Age of Loneliness" (1994)	"Out from the Deep" (1994)

Music video
- "Age of Loneliness" on YouTube

"Age of Loneliness" is a song by German musical project Enigma, released on 8 August 1994 by Virgin Records as the third single from the project's second studio album, The Cross of Changes (1993). The song was written by Jeremy Coleman, Michael Cretu and Anne Dudley, and produced by Cretu. It peaked at number 21 on the UK Singles Chart and was also a top-40 hit in the Netherlands. The accompanying music video for the song is set in New York City and entirely in sepia. People are seen floating through the air weightlessly but remain unseen by the surrounding people.

== Overview ==
The song can be regarded as a remixed version of an earlier Enigma song, "Carly's Song", where the song was originally more laid back and goes at a slower pace. The vocals in the song are whispered by Sandra Cretu.

The chant in this song is of Mongolian origin and has a tinge of Gregorian chanting in it. It is from the Mongolian traditional long song, "Tosonguyn Oroygoor", sung by Dechinzundui Nadmid. For the "Enigmatic Club Mix", the beat of the song was pushed up a notch and laced generously with beeps of morse code throughout the song. The morse code spells out "I love you". For the "Jam & Spoon Remix", the song starts off with a short and relaxing piano piece. Although included in the "Age of Loneliness" single, it is exactly the same one found in the "Carly's Song" single.

== Critical reception ==
Upon the release, Larry Flick from Billboard magazine noted, "Handled by the act's guiding force, Michael Cretu, with Jens Gad, the track has a pillowy trance personality that is darkened with vibrating minor keys and a hypnotic chanting. Essential." Alan Jones from Music Week gave it a score of four out of five in his review of the single. Angela Lewis from NME wrote, "Arabic chants swirl over a bed of synths, locked into a bubbly dance beat... it seems Enigma have pulled off another steaming cocktail of sophisticated pop."

== Sleeve ==
The background of the single cover is mostly white (or beige) and has a tarot card placed in the centre. The figure in the card might be seen as a wizard at first glance, but the person is actually a thin Santa Claus conjuring up toys. The number "7" which appears at the four corners of the card indicates that the song is the seventh track in The Cross of Changes.

== Track listing ==
1. Radio Edit – 4:14
2. Clubby Radio Edit – 3:31
3. Enigmatic Club Mix (128 bpm) – 6:23
4. Jam & Spoon Remix (93 bpm) – 6:28
5. Album Version – 5:19

== Charts ==
Chart (1994)	Peak position
Australia (ARIA)	84
Europe (Eurochart Hot 100)	79
Netherlands (Single Top 100)	40
Scotland Singles (OCC)	19
UK Singles (OCC)	21

== Release history ==
Region	Date	Format(s)	Label(s)	Ref.
United Kingdom	8 August 1994	12-inch vinyl; CD1	Virgin	
United Kingdom	15 August 1994	CD2	Virgin	
Australia	22 August 1994	CD; cassette	Virgin	
