= Enigma (German band) =

German musical project

- The Enigma logo, used since 2005

Background information
- Origin: Germany
- Genres: Worldbeat; new-age; downtempo; electronica; ambient; experimental
- Years active: 1990–present
- Labels: Virgin; EMI; Charisma
- Members: Michael Cretu
- Past members: David Fairstein.; Frank Peterson; Sandra; Louisa Stanley; Peter Cornelius; Jens Gad; Andreas Harde (Angel X); Ruth-Ann Boyle; Andru Donalds; Andy Kanavan; Elizabeth Houghton; Margarita Roig; Mark Josher; Nanuk; Aquilo; Anggun
- Website: enigmaspace.com

Enigma is a German musical project founded in 1990 by Romanian-German musician and producer Michael Cretu. Cretu had released several solo records, collaborating with various artists, and produced albums for his then-wife, German pop singer Sandra, before he conceived the idea of a new-age, worldbeat project. He recorded the first Enigma studio album, MCMXC a.D. (1990), with contributions from David Fairstein and Frank Peterson. The album remains Enigma's most successful, helped by the international hit single "Sadeness (Part I)", which sold 12 million units alone. According to Cretu, the inspiration for the project came from his desire to make a kind of music that did not obey "the old rules and habits" and presented a new form of artistic expression with a return to mysticism.

Enigma followed MCMXC a.D. with a series of albums that involved different musicians and producers working with Cretu. The first was The Cross of Changes (1993), which incorporated tribal and ethnic influences and sold over eight million copies worldwide, followed by Le Roi Est Mort, Vive Le Roi! (1996), which blended the Gregorian chants reminiscent of the first album with the strong intercultural soundscapes present in the second. Enigma's fourth album, The Screen Behind the Mirror (2000), started a slight departure from the previous world music themes towards a heavier electronic atmosphere. This evolution culminated with Voyageur (2003), its fifth and more pop-based album, and A Posteriori (2006), a work inspired by the future collision between the Milky Way and Andromeda galaxies, with distinct operatic tones and an electronic spectrum closer to Voyageur than earlier releases. Seven Lives Many Faces (2008) followed and contained a mixture of classical and modern elements, ranging from ethnic chants to rap and dubstep influences. Enigma's eighth album, The Fall of a Rebel Angel, was released in November 2016.

The project has sold over 8.5 million RIAA-certified albums in the US and an estimated 70 million worldwide, with over 100 gold and platinum certifications. It has also received two Grammy Award nominations.

== History ==
=== Formation ===
By the late 1980s, Romanian-born German musician and producer Michael Cretu had collaborated with several musicians, produced albums recorded by his then-wife, German pop singer Sandra, and released solo albums under his name for Polydor and Virgin Records, to varying levels of commercial success across Europe. In 1988, Cretu and Sandra married and relocated to the Spanish island of Ibiza. A home recording studio, A.R.T. Studios, was built, and Cretu began work on a new, worldbeat and new-age musical project named Enigma with David Fairstein and Frank Peterson. Cretu secured a deal with Munich-based Mambo Musik to handle Enigma's management and publishing.

=== 1990s ===
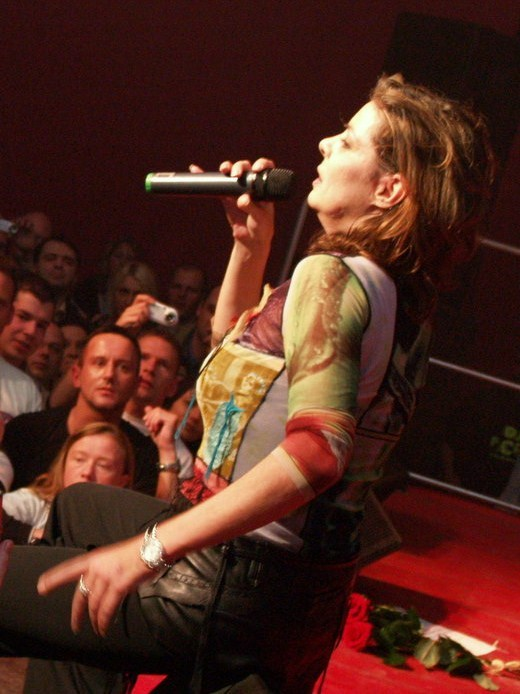
Sandra, then wife of Michael Cretu, provided vocals for Enigma from 1990 to 2003

The first Enigma album, MCMXC a.D., was recorded in eight months and incorporated Gregorian chants mixed with atmospheric music and dance beats. He had previously used a Gregorian-type chant on the opening seconds of Sandra's 1987 single "Everlasting Love". Cretu wished to exclude his name from the album's liner notes so the listener could conjure their own interpretations. He recalled management "fell off their chairs" when he requested it, "but it worked". Cretu credits himself as "Curly M.C." and Peterson is listed as "F. Gregorian". Upon its release in December 1990, MCMXC a.D. became an unexpected commercial success, helped by the international hit single "Sadeness (Part I)", released a month prior that reached number one in 24 countries. The album reached the top 10 in ten countries, including the United Kingdom, and number six on the Billboard 200 in the United States, where it sold over four million copies and charted for more than 150 weeks. The album earned over 50 platinum sales awards worldwide, and made Enigma the most successful act signed to Virgin at the time of release. Following the success of MCMXC a.D., Cretu received many offers for soundtrack work and writing film scores. He turned the majority of them down as he disliked the scripts presented to him except for the erotic thriller film Sliver (1993), for which he produced two songs for its soundtrack: "Carly's Song" and "Carly's Loneliness". The former was reworked into "Age of Loneliness" in 1993. Cretu was unable to contribute more to the soundtrack as he wished to spend his time working on the second Enigma album.

The Cross of Changes was recorded in 1993. The long period in between the first and second was partly down to Virgin and Cretu's manager forgetting to extend his contract with Virgin. This led to Cretu signing a new, five-album deal. Cretu retained many of the elements from the first album, but "wanted to have a completely different experience. I wanted to mix as much as possible rock elements and ethnic and classical". Numerous samples were used, including from songs by Genesis, Black Sabbath, Vangelis and U2. Cretu made a conscious effort to reduce the amount of Gregorian chants incorporated into the album. Cretu based much of its lyrics on the concepts behind numerology, and read books on the subject. The Cross of Changes was released in December 1993, and reached number one in the UK and number 9 in the US. Four singles were released in 1994: "Return to Innocence", "The Eyes of Truth", "Age of Loneliness" and "Out from the Deep". The first of these became an international top-10 hit in twelve countries and is certified gold in the US for selling half a million copies. The Cross of Changes sold an estimated 8 million copies worldwide.

In 1996, Le Roi Est Mort, Vive Le Roi! was released. Cretu's idea was that this third album was the child of the previous two albums, and therefore included familiar elements of Gregorian chants and Sanskrit chants in it. It did not achieve the same level of success that they enjoyed previously, and as a result, only two of the three singles originally slated were released. Le Roi Est Mort, Vive Le Roi! sold over one million units in the United States, achieved a Gold certificate in the United Kingdom and two Grammy nominations: one for its artwork design and the second as Best New Age Album. After the album's release, Cretu found that several fake Enigma albums were released onto the market that Cretu deemed as "awful messes".

=== 2000s ===
The 2000 release of The Screen Behind the Mirror included samples from Carl Orff's Carmina Burana on four tracks on the album. This time the Gregorian chants were toned down tremendously, although Shakuhachi flutes and other traditional Enigma signatures remain. Only "Gravity of Love" and "Push the Limits" were released as singles from the album. Ruth-Ann Boyle (from the band Olive) and Andru Donalds mark their first appearances on the Enigma project.

In 2001, Cretu released a new single called "Turn Around" together with Love Sensuality Devotion: The Greatest Hits and Love Sensuality Devotion: The Remix Collection to end what he considers to be the first chapter of Enigma. A light show was held at the Munich Planetarium in conjunction with the release of the compilation albums.

2003's Voyageur saw a change of direction for the project, with most of the prominent Enigma signature elements (the ethnic and Gregorian chants, the Shakuhachi flutes) no longer employed.

To commemorate the fifteen years of Enigma, a limited-edition album called 15 Years After was launched, which was the size of an LP vinyl disk, with Leonardo da Vinci's art in the cover, a big booklet with extra art, and featured eight compact discs: all the previous albums, the DVD Remember the Future, and a special and exclusive bonus CD, The Dusted Variations, which included chill-out versions of several of the project's greatest hits. All of the songs are different from the originals and use minimal percussion. This disc also contained the single version of "Hello and Welcome", which was later released as a single. On 28 August 2005, Enigma's management Crocodile Music announced the release of "Hello and Welcome" as a single. It was released in Germany on 10 March 2006.

On 26 September 2006, Enigma's sixth album A Posteriori was released worldwide, containing a new version of "Hello and Welcome" and the new song "Goodbye, Milky Way". A DVD version of A Posteriori was released on 16 December 2006, which featured kaleidoscope images in synchronization with the multi-channel remastered music. A Posteriori received a Grammy nomination as Best New Age Album, its second in that category following 1996's Le Roi Est Mort, Vive Le Roi! nomination. In late March 2007, a Private Lounge remix album version of A Posteriori was released on the iTunes Music Store. This compilation includes twelve new remixed tracks from the album by artists such as Boca Junior, Tocadisco and more. Some of these tracks were available previously on the original A Posteriori iTunes version of the album and the previously mentioned DVD release.

On 19 September 2008, Enigma's seventh album Seven Lives Many Faces was released worldwide. The lead single, "Seven Lives", is a fusion of modern and classical elements.

The Platinum Collection, a three-disc compilation, was released on 27 November 2009 in Germany, and on 9 February 2010 worldwide. The first CD contains Enigma hits. The second CD contains remixes. The third CD is a collection of "lost tracks", musical experiments which never were finalized and released previously.

=== 2010s–present ===
On 5 October 2010, to commemorate the 20th anniversary of the first album MCMXC a.D., the "Enigma's Social Song" project began. Enigma fans were asked to submit vocals for a new Enigma song. The public was then asked to vote, with the winning submission "Fei mea" being provided by Latvian singer Fox Lima (real name Alise Ketnere) for the chorus. The top three runners-up, Mark Joshua from Brazil, J. Spring from Spain, and Rasa Serra from Lithuania, provided other important parts of the vocals like the bridge, backing and verse of the final version of the single. Fans also influenced further stages of the song's creation by voting on elements such as a lead instrument, general mood, and style of the track. The final mix of the single named "MMX (The Social Song)" was released on 15 December 2010. It became the first song ever created for and by the fans via the internet.

In August 2016, Enigma's eighth studio album, The Fall of a Rebel Angel, was announced for a release on 11 November 2016. It features guest musicians Brazilian singer-songwriter Mark Josher, Indonesian singer Anggun, female voice Nanuk, and English electro-pop duo Aquilo. Two singles from the album have been released, "Sadeness (Part II)" featuring Anggun, and "Amen" featuring Aquilo.

In May 2018, limited-edition coloured vinyl editions of Enigma's entire catalogue were released in a new collection, The Colours of Enigma – The Vinyl Series. The set features new artwork and remastered stereo mixes made from the original master tapes.

Throughout 2019 and into 2020, three former vocalists for Enigma—Andru Donalds, Angel X and Fox Lima—embarked on a world tour under the name Original Enigma Voices. This marks the first time Enigma's music has been performed live.

== Awards ==
- World Music Award
  - Most Popular German Solo Artist, 2002
- ECHO
  - Most Successful German Production Abroad, 1991
  - Best Marketing, 1992
  - Best National Artist, 1992
  - Most Successful German Production Abroad, 1995
  - "Beyond the Invisible", 1997
- Over 100 platinum awards worldwide
  - 7 RIAA platinum awards
  - 2 RIAA gold awards
  - 5 BPI platinum awards
  - 2 BPI gold awards

== Recording technologies ==
Cretu recorded the first five Enigma albums at A.R.T. Studios, a home recording studio located on the Spanish island of Ibiza. From 1988 until 2001, Cretu lived in Santa Eulària des Riu followed by, from 2001 to 2008, a villa near Sant Antoni where the studio was redesigned and built by Gunter Wagner and Bernd Steber. A Posteriori and Seven Lives Many Faces were recorded using an all-in-one mobile digital recording studio named Alchemist. In 2010, a reworked version of Alchemist was built and named Merlin. "MMX The Social Song" was the first Enigma release recorded with this model.

== Sampling and lawsuits ==
In 1991, Cretu was sued by and later settled with Munich-based choir Capella Antiqua and its record label Polydor Germany for infringing its "right of personality" through distortion in the samples used in "Sadeness (Part I)" and "Mea Culpa (Part II)". The samples were taken from Capella Antiqua's 1976 LP Paschale Mysterium. Although the musical compositions were in the public domain, Capella Antiqua's recording of them was copyrighted. European law also recognizes moral rights (droit moral) in works.

In 1998, Cretu was sued by Taiwanese musicians Difang and Igay Duana (also known as Kuo Ying-nan and Kuo Hsiu-chu), whose voices are used in "Return to Innocence", over the unauthorized usage of their song without credit. The case was settled out of court for an undisclosed amount of money and all further releases of the song were credited (including royalties) to the Kuos. Cretu has stated that he had been led to believe that the recording was in the public domain and that he did not intentionally violate the Kuos' copyright.

== Musical style ==
Enigma generally produces worldbeat and New-age songs. The musical project is very experimental, often combining elements from other genres like ambience, pop, or rock. Michael Cretu has said in an Q&A that he is "always looking for the unknown and I am trying to find new ways to express my ideas." He later said:

Enigma is all about reaching the limit and even moving forward from the already known. Experiments are a big part of my work and with every record Enigma has released there is something new.

Enigma's first album, MCMXC a.D., combines Gregorian chants and religious overtones with atmospheric synths, a hypnotic music-set, and a dance-like beat, along with elements of pop and ambience all accompanied by French-like whispers and somewhat erotic gasps, provided by Sandra. The Cross of Changes, Enigma's second album, replaces the Gregorian chants from the MCMXC a.D. with ethnic and tribal chanting. The album is atmospheric and spiritual like MCMXC a.D., but is combined with more well-developed beats and lyrics about love and self-awareness. Most other albums follow similar themes that often "revolve around religion, sex, numerology, and life" according to Micheal.

== Legacy ==
Enigma's international success with MCMXC a.D. was a precursor to the creation of several other musical projects that follow similar styles and marketing approaches, especially the use of the term "project" as opposed to the band to denominate themselves, and the label "enigmatic music", employed mainly by radios and listeners, to categorize their music inside the new-age umbrella. Cretu has cited the progressive rock band Yes as an influence.

Soon after working with Michael Cretu on the first Enigma album, German producer Frank Peterson left the project to focus on Gregorian, a band that performs mostly covers of modern pop and rock songs with Gregorian-like vocals and symphonic instruments. Likewise, French musical project Era features Gregorian chants mixed with pop-rock arrangements and is also frequently compared in scope to Enigma.

More electronic projects that often draw comparisons with Enigma are French act Deep Forest, Canadian duo Delerium, Danish project Achillea (created by Enigma's co-producer and guest guitarist Jens Gad) and German project Schiller.

== Personnel ==
Current members

- Michael Cretu – music, lyrics, vocals, production, arrangements, programming, engineering (1990–present)

Former members and guest artists

- Fabrice Cuitad (alias David Fairstein) – lyrics (1990–2000)
- Frank Peterson (F. Gregorian) – samples, production, engineering, co-writer (1990–1991)
- Sandra Cretu – vocals, voices (1990–2003)
- Louisa Stanley – voices (1990–1996; 2006)
- Jens Gad – guitars (1993; 2000–2003), arrangements and co-writing (2000–2003)
- Peter Cornelius – guitars (1993–1996)
- Andreas Harde (Andy Jonas / Angel X) – vocals (1993)
- Todd Peleg – backing vocals (1993–1994)
- Andy Kanavan - percussion (2000-2003)
- Andru Donalds – vocals (1999–2008), co-writer (2008)
- Ruth-Ann Boyle – vocals (1999–2003; 2008)
- Elizabeth Houghton – voices (1999–2000)
- Sebastian C. – vocals (2008)
- Nikita C. – vocals (2008)
- Margarita Roig – vocals, co-writer (2008)
- Nanuk – voices (2008, 2016)
- Alise Ketnere (Fox Lima) – vocals, co-writer (2010)
- Jérôme Pringault (J. Spring) – vocals, co-writer (2010)
- Mark Josher (Marcelo Amaral Pontello) – vocals, co-writer (2010, 2016)
- Rasa Veretenceviene (Rasa Serra) – vocals, co-writer (2010)
- Anggun – vocals (2016)
- Aquilo – vocals (2016)
- Michael Kunze – story, co-writer (2016)

== Discography ==
Studio albums

- MCMXC a.D. (1990)
- The Cross of Changes (1993)
- Le Roi Est Mort, Vive Le Roi! (1996)
- The Screen Behind the Mirror (2000)
- Voyageur (2003)
- A Posteriori (2006)
- Seven Lives Many Faces (2008)
- The Fall of a Rebel Angel (2016)
- MMXXVIII a.D. (2028)

== See also ==
- List of ambient music artists

== Sources ==
- Allmusic biography and discography
- Discogs.com Biography and discography
