= List of awards and nominations received by the Veronicas =

The Veronicas awards and nominations
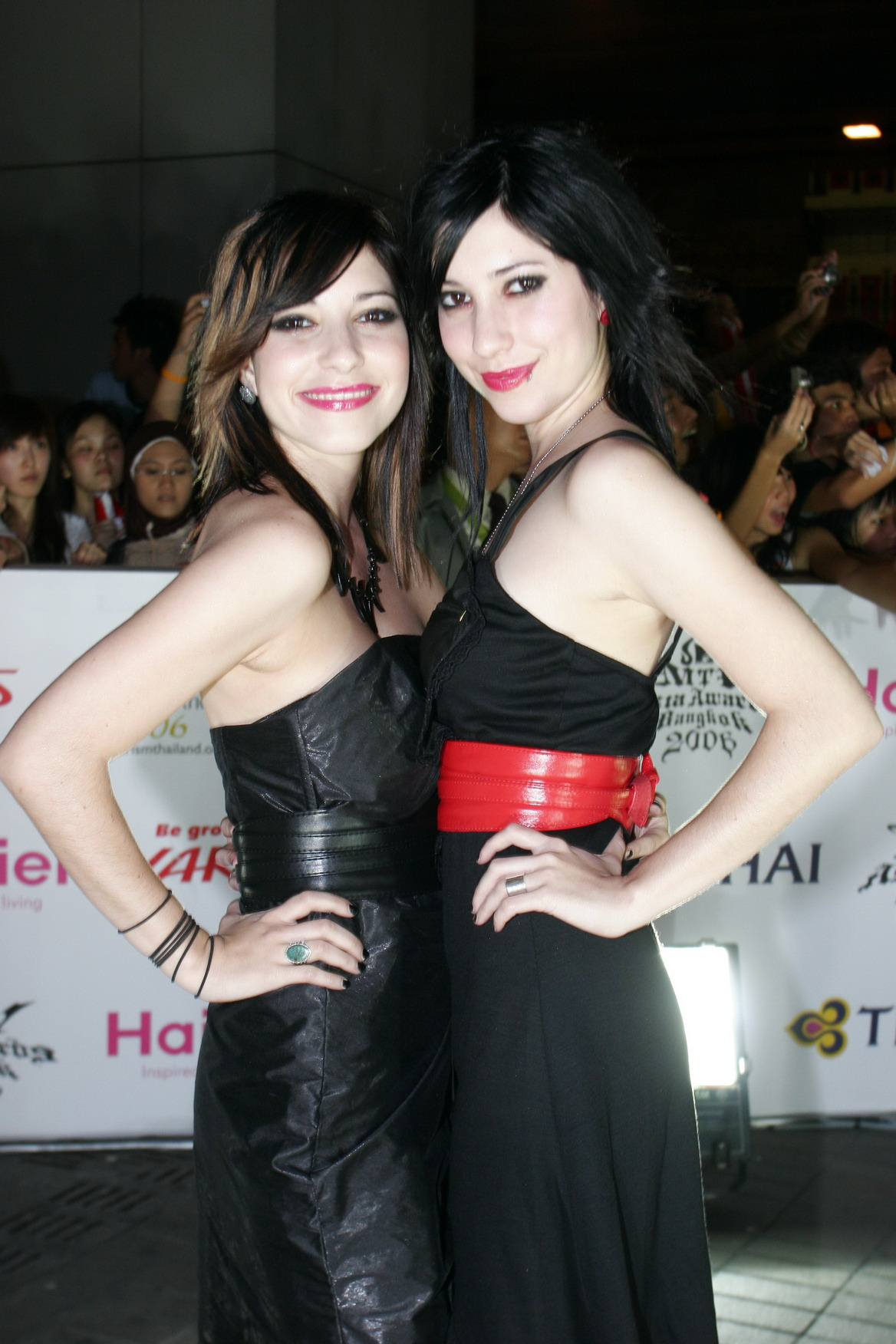
- The Veronicas at MTV Asia Awards 2006 in Bangkok, Thailand
Awards and nominations
Award	Wins	Nominations
APRA	0	2
ARIA	2	10
Los Premios MTV Latinoamérica	0	2
MTV Australia	3	7
MTV Europe	0	1
Nickelodeon Australian Kids' Choice	3	7
TMF Belgium	1	1

Totals (Note: Certain award groups do not simply award one winner. They acknowledge several different recipients, have runners-up, and have third place. Since this is a specific recognition and is different from losing an award, runner-up mentions are considered wins in this award tally. For simplification and to avoid errors, each award in this list has been presumed to have had a prior nomination.)
- Wins: 13
- Nominations: 44

The Veronicas are an Australian pop music duo. Formed in Brisbane in 2005, the group consists of twin sisters Jessica and Lisa Origliasso. The Veronicas have released three studio albums, The Secret Life Of... (2005), Hook Me Up (2007) and The Veronicas (2014).

The Veronicas have won and been nominated for numerous music awards. They include two ARIA Music Award, two Channel V Oz Artist of the Year awards and three MTV Australia Awards. In 2008 The Veronicas received an ARIA No.1 Award for their single, "Hook Me Up", reaching number-one on the Australian Singles Chart in 2007. Additionally they have been nominated for seven ARIA Music Awards, an APRA Award and an MTV Europe Music Award.

== APRA Awards ==
The APRA Awards were established by the Australasian Performing Right Association (APRA) in 1982 to honour the achievements of songwriters and music composers, and to recognise their songwriting skills, sales and airplay performance, by its members annually. The Veronicas have been nominated twice: once in 2009 for Most Played Australian Work for their single "Untouched", which was written by Jessica, Lisa Origliasso and Tobias Gad; in 2015 "You Ruin Me" (co-written by the duo along with Anthony Egizii and David Musumeci) was nominated for Song of the Year.

Year	Nominee / work	Award	Result
2009	"Untouched"	Most Played Australian Work	Nominated
2015	"You Ruin Me"	Song of the Year	Nominated

== ARIA Music Awards ==
The ARIA Music Awards have been presented by the Australian Recording Industry Association (ARIA) since 1987. These awards recognise excellence in Australian music across different genres. The Veronicas have been nominated ten times for two wins: Best Pop Release in 2006 for their debut album The Secret Life Of... and Best Video for "You Ruin Me" – directed by Matt Sharp and Daniel James – in 2015.

Year	Nominee / work	Award	Result
2005	"4ever"	Best Breakthrough Artist – Single	Nominated
2006	The Secret Life Of...	Best Pop Release	Won
2006	The Secret Life Of...	Breakthrough Artist – Album	Nominated
2006	The Secret Life Of...	Highest Selling Album	Nominated
2008	Hook Me Up	Best Pop Release	Nominated
2008	Hook Me Up	Highest Selling Album	Nominated
2008	"Untouched"	Highest Selling Single	Nominated
2008	"Hook Me Up"	Highest Selling Single	Nominated
2015	"You Ruin Me"	Song of the Year	Nominated
2015	"You Ruin Me" – Matt Sharp, Daniel James	Best Video	Won
2016	"In My Blood"	Best Group	Nominated
2016	"In My Blood"	Best Pop Release	Nominated
2016	"In My Blood"	Song of the Year	Nominated
2023	Vodka Cruiser: The Solo Project (BRING Agency)	Best Use of an Australian Recording in an Advertisement (over 2 minutes duration)	Nominated

== Berlin Music Video Awards ==
The Berlin Music Video Awards is an international festival that promotes the art of music videos.

Year	Nominee / work	Award	Result
2024	Perfect	Best Song	Nominated

== ARIA No.1 Chart Awards ==
The ARIA No.1 Chart awards were established in 2002, by the Australian Recording Industry Association (ARIA), to recognise Australian artists who achieved a number-one single, album or music DVD on the Australian music charts. The Veronicas have won two ARIA No.1 Awards: one in 2008 for their single "Hook Me Up", which peaked at number-one on the Australian Singles Chart on 18 November 2007; and in 2014 for "You Ruin Me" which debuted atop the chart on 5 October 2014.

Year	Nominee / work	Award	Result
2007	"Hook Me Up"	Reaching number-one on the ARIA Singles Chart	Won
2014	"You Ruin Me"	Reaching number-one on the ARIA Singles Chart	Won

== Channel V ==
The [V] Oz Artist of the Year Award honours the "finest artists for valour, excellence and innovation" and is chosen by the Australian public. It is presented annually at the ARIA Awards.

Year	Nominee / work	Award	Result
2005	The Veronicas	OZ Artists of the Year	Nominated
2006	The Veronicas	OZ Artists of the Year	Nominated
2007	The Veronicas	OZ Artists of the Year	Nominated
2008	The Veronicas	OZ Artists of the Year	Nominated
2009	The Veronicas	OZ Artists of the Year	Nominated
2011	The Veronicas	OZ Artists of the Year	Nominated
2012	The Veronicas	OZ Artists of the Year	Nominated
2013	The Veronicas	OZ Artists of the Year	Nominated

== Dolly Teen Choice Awards ==
The Dolly Teen Choice Awards were established in 2006 by Dolly Magazineo honour achievements in music, fashion, sport, television and media personalities. The nominees are chosen by the magazine, and the winner is selected by public vote. The Veronicas have won two Dolly Teen Choice Awards from three nominations.

Year	Nominee / work	Award	Result
2006	The Veronicas	Hottest Music Act	Won
2006	The Secret Life Of...	Hottest Album of 2006	Nominated
2008	Hook Me Up	Most played on my iPod	Won

== MTV Awards ==
=== Los Premios MTV Latinoamérica ===
The Los Premios MTV Latinoamérica were established in 2002 by MTV Networks Latin America (MTVNLA). These awards celebrate the years best music videos in Latin America and the world. The Veronicas have received two nominations at the Los Premios MTV Latinoamérica 2009 awards.

Year	Nominee / work	Award	Result
2009	Themselves	Best New Artist — International	Nominated
2009	"Untouched"	Best Live Performance at "Los Premios 2009"	Nominated

=== MTV Australia Awards ===
The MTV Australia Awards (MTVAA) is an annual awards ceremony established in 2005 by MTV Australia. The Veronicas have won three awards from seven nominations, including the 'Video of the Year' award in 2006 for "4ever".

Year	Nominee / work	Award	Result
2006	The Veronicas	Spankin' New Aussie Artist	Won
2006	"4ever"	Video of the Year	Won
2006	"4ever"	Best Pop Video	Nominated
2006	The Veronicas	Viewer's Choice Award	Nominated
2007	"Revolution"	Best Pop Video	Nominated
2008	The Veronicas	Best Australian Artist	Won
2009	The Veronicas	Best Aussie	Nominated

=== MTV Europe Music Awards ===
The MTV Europe Music Awards (EMA) were established in 1994 by MTV Networks Europe to celebrate the most popular music in Europe. The Veronicas have been nominated once in 2009 for 'Best Push Act'.

Year	Nominee / work	Award	Result
2009	The Veronicas	Best Push Act	Nominated
2016	The Veronicas	Best Australian Act	Nominated

== Nickelodeon Australian Kids' Choice Awards ==
The Nickelodeon Australian Kids' Choice Awards is an annual awards show, established in 2003 by Nickelodeon Australia. The awards honour the best in film, television, music, books and personalities as voted by young people. The Veronicas have received three awards out of seven nominations, including the 'Fave Band' award which they won in 2007 and 2008.

Year	Nominee / work	Award	Result
2006	The Veronicas	Fave Aussie Group	Won
2006	The Veronicas	Fave Celeb Duo	Nominated
2006	"When It All Falls Apart"	Fave Song	Nominated
2007	The Veronicas	Fave Band	Won
2007	The Veronicas	Fave Celeb Duo	Nominated
2008	The Veronicas	Fave Band	Won
2008	Untouched	Fave song	Nominated

== Premios Oye! ==
Premios Oye! are presented annually by the Academia Nacional de la Música en México for outstanding achievements in Mexican record industry. The Veronicas have received one nomination.

Year	Nominee / work	Award	Result
2009	The Veronicas	Best International New Artist	Nominated

== Queensland Music Awards ==
The Queensland Music Awards (previously known as Q Song Awards) are annual awards celebrating Queensland, Australia's brightest emerging artists and established legends. They commenced in 2006.

Year	Nominee / work	Award	Result (wins only)
2016	The Veronicas	Highest Selling Album	Won
2017	"In My Blood"	Highest Selling Single	Won

== Rolling Stone Awards (Australia) ==
The Rolling Stone Australia Awards are awarded annually by Rolling Stone Australia magazine since 2010 for outstanding contributions to music and popular culture in the previous year. The Veronicas have been nominated once.

Year	Nominee / work	Award	Result
2015	"You Ruin Me"	Music Video of the Year	Nominated

== TMF Awards ==
The TMF awards were established in 1995 by The Music Factory (TMF) in Belgium to recognise achievements in music. The Veronicas have received one award from one nomination in 2006 for the Best International New Artist.

Year	Nominee / work	Award	Result
2006	The Veronicas	Best International New Artist	Won
