= List of songs recorded by the Veronicas =

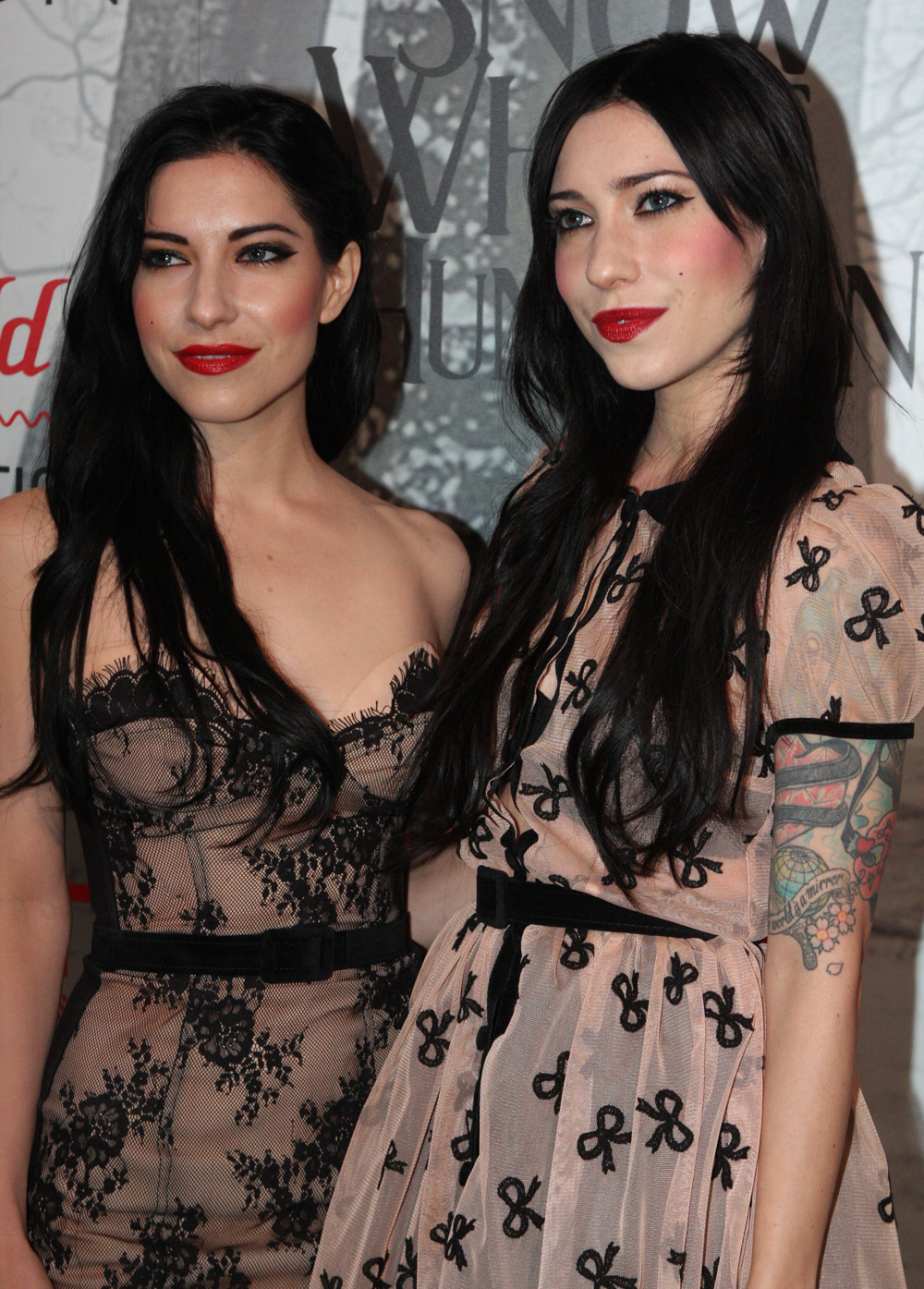
(From left to right) Lisa Origliasso and Jessica Origliasso of the Veronicas at the Australian premiere of Snow White and the Huntsman in 2012.

Australian duo the Veronicas, whose members are twin sisters Jessica Origliasso and Lisa Origliasso, have recorded songs for three studio albums. Having signed with Engine Room Recordings at the age of 19, the Origliasso twins received funding to write and record demos for other artists with different songwriters around the world. By the age of 20, the duo signed with Sire Records in the United States and began working on their debut studio album The Secret Life Of.... The lead single "4ever" was co-written by Dr. Luke and Max Martin who also co-wrote the second single "Everything I'm Not" with the Origliasso twins and Rami Yacoub. The former song reached number two on the Australian ARIA Charts, while the latter peaked at number seven. The duo collaborated with Josh Alexander and Billy Steinberg on "When It All Falls Apart" and "Leave Me Alone", both third and fifth singles from the album, respectively. "Revolution", the fourth single from The Secret Life Of... was written by Raine Maida and Chantal Kreviazuk. Preceding the release of the album, the Origliasso's co-wrote the songs "All About Us", "Faded" and "What's Going On" which were later recorded by t.A.T.u., Kate DeAraugo and Casey Donovan, respectively.

In 2007, the Veronicas released their second album Hook Me Up on 3 November 2007. Most of the album was co-written by the Origliasso sisters along with Toby Gad. Together they wrote "Take Me on the Floor", "Untouched" and "Popular", the latter of which features co-writing credits from Beni Barca. The duo also share writing credits with Greg Wells and Shelly Peiken for the album's lead single "Hook Me Up", which became their first number-one hit. The song "This Love" was written for the duo by Gad and Kesha (credited under her full name Kesha Sebert).

Following extensive touring to promote Hook Me Up, which concluded in December 2009, the Veronicas took a short hiatus before commencing work on their third album in 2010. Two years later, the duo released "Lolita" as the lead single for their third album which was then titled Life on Mars. The song was co-written by the twins, along with Gad and LP (credited as Laura Pergolizzi). The album's release date was being pushed back constantly by their label Warner Bros. Records (the parent company or Sire Records) which led to the Veronicas leaving the label. By 2014, the duo signed a new deal with Sony Music and the third album was retitled The Veronicas. The record features the singles "You Ruin Me" and "If You Love Someone", both co-written by the Origliasso's and DNA Songs, with the former track becoming their second Australian number-one hit. The Veronicas went onto release a series of singles between 2016 and 2021 (In My Blood, On Your Side, Think Of Me, Biting My Tongue, The Only High) when eventually came to an album two album conclusion called: Godzilla and Human

== Songs ==
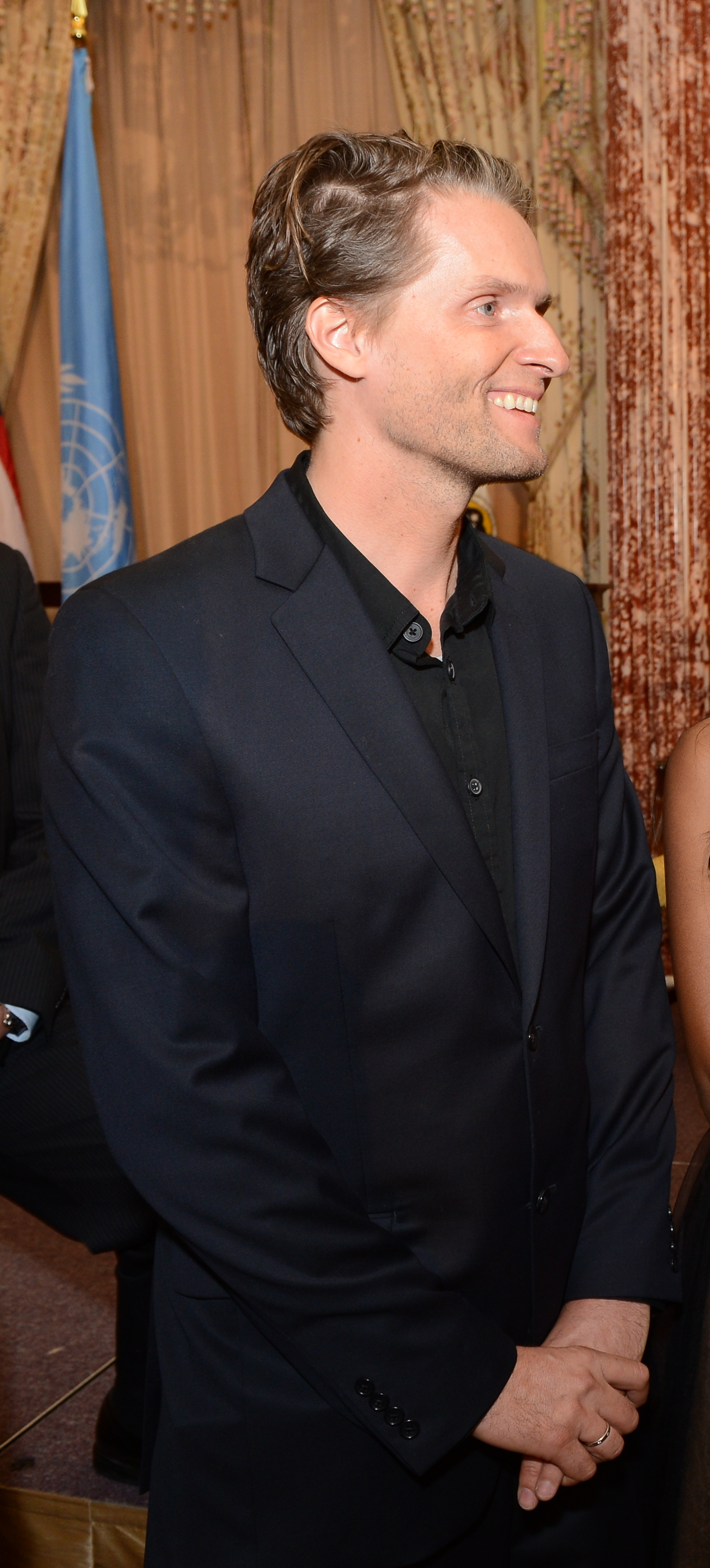
Toby Gad has co-written and produced a majority of the songs on all three of the Veronicas' studio albums.

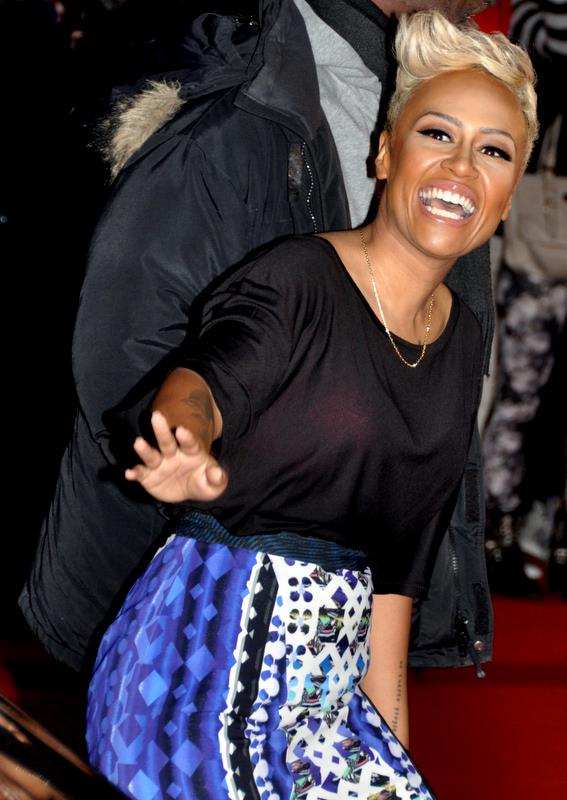
Emeli Sandé (pictured) co-wrote "Always" with Chris Loco.

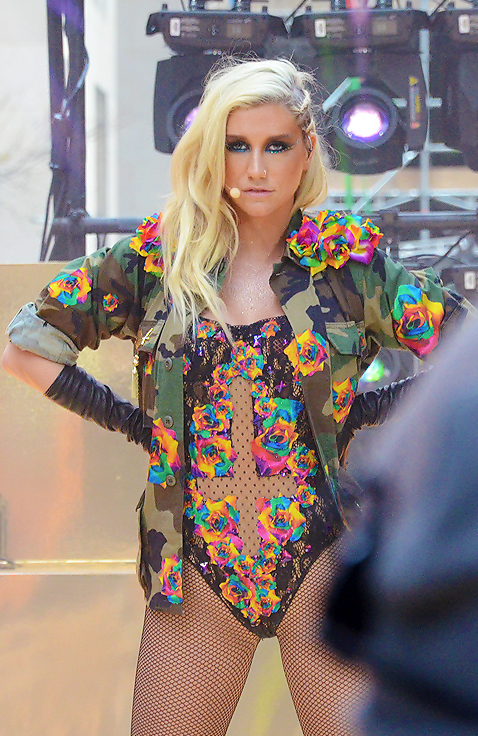
"This Love" was co-written by Kesha (pictured) along with Gad.

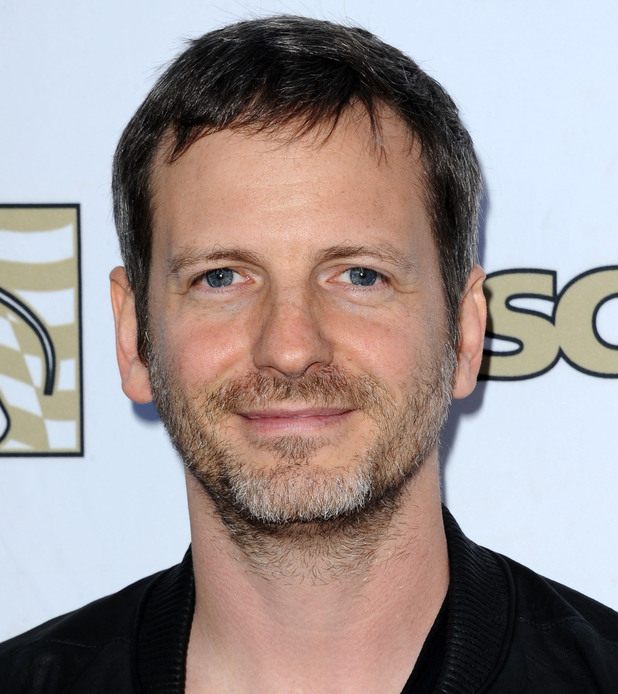
Dr. Luke co-wrote the Veronicas' first two singles "4ever" and "Everything I'm Not" from their debut album.

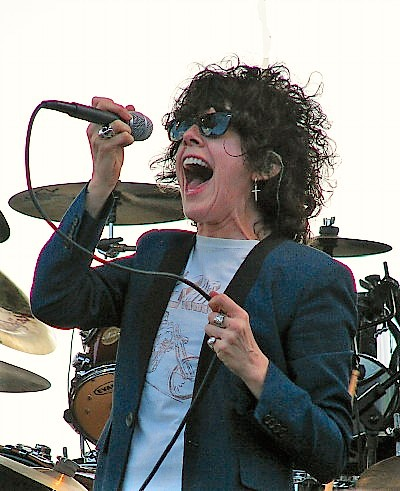
LP co-wrote two songs with the Origliasso twins including, "Lolita" and "Line of Fire".

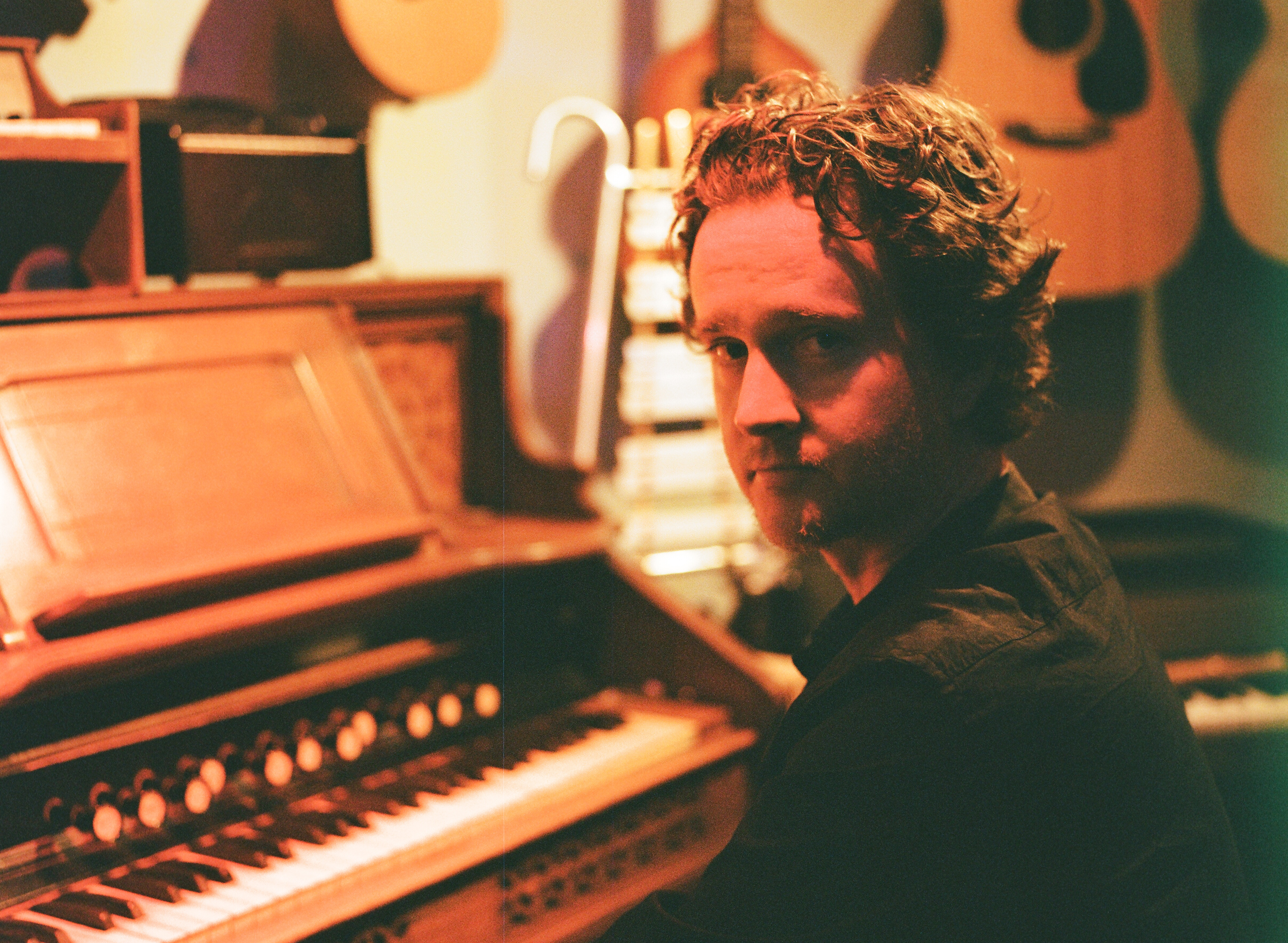
The Veronicas co-wrote their first number-one hit "Hook Me Up" with Greg Wells (pictured) and Shelly Peiken.

Key
†	Indicates single release

Song	Artist(s)	Writer(s)	Album	Year	Ref.
"4ever" †	The Veronicas	Lukasz Gottwald; Max Martin	The Secret Life Of...	2005	
"A Teardrop Hitting the Ground" (Note: "A Teardrop Hitting the Ground" was included as a bonus track on the Brazilian release of The Secret Life Of....)	The Veronicas	Rick Nowels; Kelli Ali	The Secret Life Of...	2005	
"All I Have"	The Veronicas	Toby Gad; Jessica Origliasso; Lisa Origliasso	Hook Me Up	2007	
"Always"	The Veronicas	Chris Loco; Emeli Sandé	The Veronicas	2014	
"Born Bob Dylan"	The Veronicas	Susan Cagle; Toby Gad; Jessica Origliasso; Lisa Origliasso	The Veronicas	2014	
"Change the World" (Note: "Change the World" was included as a bonus track on the US digital release of Hook Me Up.)	The Veronicas	John Feldmann; Jessica Origliasso	Hook Me Up	2009	
"Cold"	The Veronicas	Gary Clark; Jessica Origliasso; Lisa Origliasso	The Veronicas	2014	
"Cruel" †	The Veronicas	Rob Ellmore; Leah Haywood; Daniel James; Jessica Origliasso; Lisa Origliasso	The Veronicas	2014	
"Did Ya Think" (Note: "Did Ya Think" is a b-side track on the "4ever" CD single.)	The Veronicas	Kara DioGuardi; Clif Magness; Jessica Origliasso; Lisa Origliasso	The Secret Life Of...	2005	
"Did You Miss Me (I’m a Veronica)"	The Veronicas	Josh Alexander; Toby Gad; Jessica Origliasso; Lisa Origliasso	The Veronicas	2014	
"Don't Say Goodbye" (Note: "Don't Say Goodbye" was included as a bonus track on the US digital release of Hook Me Up.)	The Veronicas featuring Tania Doko	Toby Gad; Jessica Origliasso; Lisa Origliasso; Tania Doko	Hook Me Up	2009	
"Everything" (Note: "Everything" was included as a bonus track on the US digital release of Hook Me Up.)	The Veronicas	Robert J. Guariglia; Jessica Origliasso; Lisa Origliasso; Paul De Vincenzo George Pimentel	Hook Me Up	2009	
"Everything I'm Not" †	The Veronicas	Lukasz Gottwald; Max Martin; Jessica Origliasso; Lisa Origliasso; Rami Yacoub	The Secret Life Of...	2006	
"Goodbye to You"	The Veronicas	Zackery Holt Smith	Hook Me Up	2007	
"Grown-Up Christmas List"	The Veronicas	David Foster; Linda Thompson-Jenner	The Spirit of Christmas 2010	2010	
"Heavily Broken"	The Veronicas	Eric Nova; Jessica Origliasso; Lisa Origliasso	The Secret Life Of...	2006	
"Hook Me Up" †	The Veronicas	Jessica Origliasso; Lisa Origliasso; Shelly Peiken; Greg Wells	Hook Me Up	2007	
"Hollywood" (Note: "Hollywood" is the b-side track on the "Untouched" CD single.)	The Veronicas	Toby Gad; Jessica Origliasso; Lisa Origliasso	—N/a	2007	
"How Long" (Note: "How Long" is a b-side track on the "4ever" CD single.)	The Veronicas	Jessica Origliasso; Lisa Origliasso; Malcolm Pardon; Fredrik Rinman	—N/a	2005	
"I Can't Stay Away"	The Veronicas	Josh Alexander; Billy Steinberg	Hook Me Up	2007	
"I Could Get Used to This"	The Veronicas	Josh Alexander; Billy Steinberg; Jessica Origliasso; Lisa Origliasso	The Secret Life Of...	2006	
"I Don't Wanna Wait"	The Veronicas	John Feldmann; Jessica Origliasso; Lisa Origliasso	Hook Me Up	2007	
"If You Love Someone" †	The Veronicas	Anthony Egizii; Josh Katz; David Musumeci; Jessica Origliasso; Lisa Origliasso	The Veronicas	2014	
"In My Blood" †	The Veronicas	Anthony Egizii; David Musumeci; Jessica Origliasso; Lisa Origliasso	Godzilla	2016	
"Insomnia" (Note: "Insomnia" is the b-side track on the "Hook Me Up" CD single.)	The Veronicas	Toby Gad; Jessica Origliasso; Lisa Origliasso	—N/a	2008	
"Leave Me Alone" †	The Veronicas	Josh Alexander; Billy Steinberg; Jessica Origliasso; Lisa Origliasso	The Secret Life Of...	2006	
"Let Me Out"	The Veronicas	Hayden Bell; Sarah Lundback; Bell Martin Hansen; Jessica Origliasso; Lisa Origliasso	The Veronicas	2014	
"Line of Fire"	The Veronicas	Toby Gad; Jessica Origliasso; Lisa Origliasso; Laura Pergolizzi	The Veronicas	2014	
"Lolita" †	The Veronicas	Toby Gad; Jessica Origliasso; Lisa Origliasso; Laura Pergolizzi	—N/a	2012	
"Mad Love"	The Veronicas	Josh Alexander; Toby Gad; Jessica Origliasso; Lisa Origliasso	The Veronicas	2014	
"More Like Me"	The Veronicas	Dave Bassett; Josh Katz; Jessica Origliasso; Lisa Origliasso	The Veronicas	2014	
"Mother Mother"	The Veronicas	Tracy Bonham	The Secret Life Of...	2006	
"Mouth Shut"	The Veronicas	Toby Gad; Jessica Origliasso; Lisa Origliasso	The Secret Life Of...	2006	
"Nobody Wins"	The Veronicas	Kara DioGuardi; Clif Magness; Jessica Origliasso; Lisa Origliasso	The Secret Life Of...	2006	
"On Your Side" †	The Veronicas	Jessica Origliasso; Lisa Origliasso; Wayne Hector; Jim Eliot	Human	2016	
"Popular" †	The Veronicas	Beni Barca; Toby Gad; Jessica Origliasso; Lisa Origliasso	Hook Me Up	2008	
"Revenge Is Sweeter (Than You Ever Were)"	The Veronicas	Toby Gad; Jessica Origliasso; Lisa Origliasso	Hook Me Up	2007	
"Revolution" †	The Veronicas	Chantal Kreviazuk; Raine Maida	The Secret Life Of...	2006	
"Sanctified"	The Veronicas	Tyler Bryant; Roger Alan Nichols; Jessica Origliasso; Lisa Origliasso	The Veronicas	2014	
"Secret"	The Veronicas	Toby Gad; Jessica Origliasso; Lisa Origliasso	The Secret Life Of...	2006	
"Someone Wake Me Up"	The Veronicas	Josh Alexander; Billy Steinberg; Jessica Origliasso; Lisa Origliasso	Hook Me Up	2007	
"Speechless"	The Veronicas	Toby Gad; Jessica Origliasso; Lisa Origliasso	The Secret Life Of...	2006	
"Take Me on the Floor" †	The Veronicas	Toby Gad; Jessica Origliasso; Lisa Origliasso	Hook Me Up	2008	
"Teenage Millionaire"	The Veronicas	Rob Ellmore; Leah Haywood; Daniel James; Jessica Origliasso; Lisa Origliasso	The Veronicas	2014	
"The Wild Side"	The Veronicas	Unknown	Hanni & Nanni – Original Motion Picture Soundtrack	2010	
"This Love" †	The Veronicas	Toby Gad; Kesha Sebert	Hook Me Up	2008	
"Untouched" †	The Veronicas	Toby Gad; Jessica Origliasso; Lisa Origliasso	Hook Me Up	2007	
"Us Against the World"	The Veronicas	Alexander Geringas; Erik Nyholm; Tebey Ottoh	Hanni & Nanni – Original Motion Picture Soundtrack	2010	
"When It All Falls Apart" †	The Veronicas	Josh Alexander; Billy Steinberg; Jessica Origliasso; Lisa Origliasso	The Secret Life Of...	2006	
"You and Me"	The Veronicas	Alex Dezen; Jessica Origliasso; Lisa Origliasso	The Veronicas	2014	
"You Ruin Me" †	The Veronicas	Anthony Egizii; David Musumeci; Jessica Origliasso; Lisa Origliasso	The Veronicas	2014	

== See also ==
- The Veronicas discography
