= The Veronicas discography =

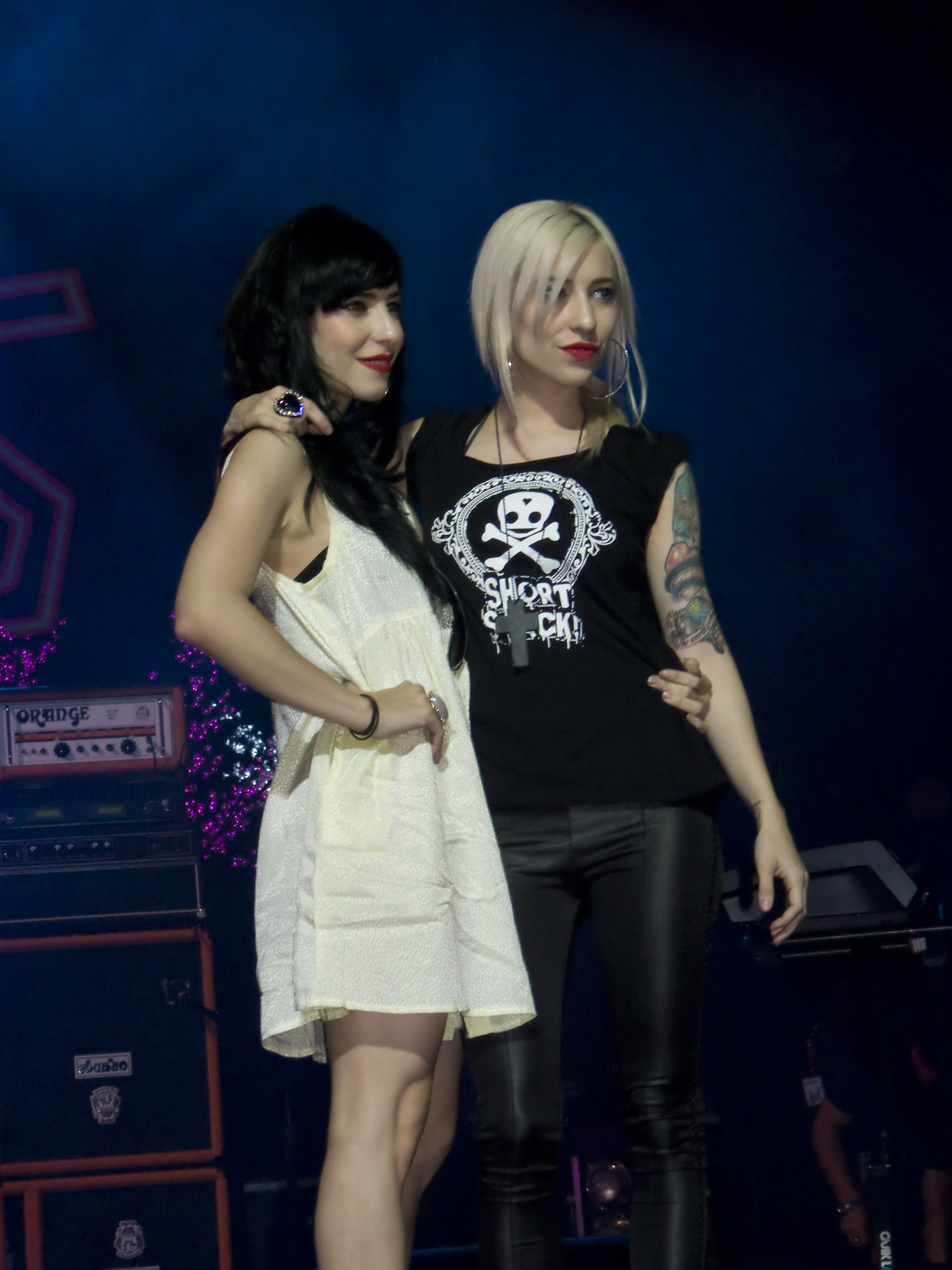
- The Veronicas in 2009
- Studio albums: 6
- Extended plays: 3
- Live albums: 2
- Compilation albums: 2
- Singles: 25
- Video albums: 2
- Music videos: 15

Australian pop duo the Veronicas have released six studio albums, two live albums, one compilation album, three extended plays, twenty-four singles, fifteen music videos and two video albums. Their debut studio album, The Secret Life Of..., was released in Australia in October 2005. Influenced by pop rock, pop punk and teen pop genres, the album was successful in Australia, where it reached number two and gained quadruple Platinum certification from the Australian Recording Industry Association (ARIA). The album's lead single, "4ever", peaked at number two on the Australian Singles Chart and became a top-twenty hit in countries such as Ireland, New Zealand and the United Kingdom. Four additional singles were released from the album, including "Everything I'm Not" and "When It All Falls Apart", which reached the top ten in Australia and earned Gold certification.

The Veronicas' second studio album, Hook Me Up, was released in November 2007. Musically, Hook Me Up differs from its predecessor and features the genres of dance and electronic. It reached number two in Australia and was certified double Platinum. The album's title track became the Veronicas' first number one single on the Australian Singles Chart. Subsequent single "Untouched" became their most successful release worldwide, peaking at number one in Ireland, number two in Australia, and the top ten in Canada, New Zealand and the United Kingdom. In the United States, "Untouched" became the first single by an Australian act to sell one million downloads. Hook Me Up also produced the top-ten hits "This Love" and "Take Me on the Floor", both of which were certified Gold in Australia. Following a hiatus, the Veronicas released "Lolita" in 2012, which charted in the top forty of the Australian Singles Chart and was certified Gold. Their self-titled third studio album was released in November 2014, seven years after their previous album Hook Me Up (2007). The Veronicas contains multiple genres such as blues, trip hop, rock and roll, grunge and rap, while still retaining some of their more familiar pop rock and electronic rock sound. The album's first single, "You Ruin Me", debuted at number one on the Australian Singles Chart, becoming their second number one single and their first to debut in the top spot. "In My Blood" became the girls' third number one single in Australia, remaining at number one for two consecutive weeks. A follow-up single, "On Your Side", was released on 15 October 2016; a further follow-up called "The Only High" came out in 2017, with a later single "Think of Me" coming out in 2019. They followed that up with "Biting My Tongue" in 2020 and then they announced their forthcoming album would be called Human, also announced that year. They announced and then released the single "Godzilla" from Godzilla the album in May 2021, released before Human, which came out a month later (June 2021). They signed with Big Noise in 2022. Gothic Summer was released on 22 March 2024.

== Albums ==
=== Studio albums ===
List of studio albums, with selected chart positions and certifications
| Title | Album details | Peak chart positions | | | | | | | | | Certifications |
| Title | Album details | AUS | BEL (FL) | FRA | IRE | NLD | NZ | SWI | UK | US | Certifications |
|---|---|---|---|---|---|---|---|---|---|---|---|
| The Secret Life Of... | Released: 14 October 2005 (AU); Label: Sire, Warner Bros., EngineRoom; Format: CD, CD+DVD, digital download, LP, streaming | 2 | 11 | — | — | 75 | 5 | 61 | — | 133 | ARIA: 4× Platinum; RMNZ: Gold |
| Hook Me Up | Released: 3 November 2007 (AU); Label: Sire, EngineRoom; Format: CD, CD+DVD, digital download, LP, streaming | 2 | — | 134 | 33 | — | 8 | 38 | 35 | 107 | ARIA: 2× Platinum; RIAA: Gold; RMNZ: Platinum |
| The Veronicas | Released: 21 November 2014 (AU); Label: Sony; Format: CD, digital download, streaming | 2 | — | — | — | — | 27 | — | 49 | — | ARIA: Platinum |
| Godzilla | Released: 28 May 2021; Label: Sony Music Australia; Formats: Digital download, streaming, CD, LP | 7 | — | — | — | — | — | — | — | — | |
| Human | Released: 25 June 2021; Label: Sony Music Australia; Formats: Digital download, streaming, CD, LP | 5 | — | — | — | — | — | — | — | — | |
| Gothic Summer | Released: 22 March 2024; Label: Big Noise; Formats: Digital download, streaming, CD, LP | 6 | — | — | — | — | — | — | — | — | |
"—" denotes a recording that did not chart or was not released in that territory.

=== Live albums ===
List of live albums, with selected chart positions and certifications
| Title | Album details | Peak chart position | | Certifications |
| Title | Album details | AUS | AUS DVD | Certifications |
|---|---|---|---|---|
| Exposed... the Secret Life of The Veronicas | Released: 2 December 2006 (AU); Label: Warner, Warner Bros., Sire, EngineRoom; Formats: DVD+CD, DD | — | 3 | ARIA: 2× Platinum |
| Revenge Is Sweeter Tour | Released: 4 September 2009 (AU); Label: Sire, Warner Bros., EngineRoom; Formats: CD+DVD, DD | 91 | — | |
"—" denotes a recording that did not chart or was not released in that territory.

=== Compilation albums ===
List of compilation albums
| Title | Album details |
|---|---|
| Complete | Released: 18 March 2009 (JP); Format: 2×CD; Label: Sire, EngineRoom, Pony Canyon |
| Untouched | Released: 27 April 2018; Format: Digital; Label: Warner Bros. |

== Extended plays ==
List of extended plays
| Title | Details |
|---|---|
| AOL Sessions Live | Released: 21 February 2006 (US); Label: Sire, Warner Bros.; Format: digital download |
| Mtv.com Live | Released: 1 August 2006; Label: Sire; Format: digital download |
| Unplugged | Released: 2006; Label: Sire, Warner Bros.; Format: digital download |
| Untouched: Lost Tracks | Released: 6 January 2009; Label: Sire, Warner Bros.; Format: digital download |

== Singles ==
=== As lead artist ===
List of singles, with selected chart positions and certifications, showing year released and album name
| Title | Year | Peak chart positions | | | | | | | | | | Certifications | Album |
| Title | Year | AUS | AUT | CAN | GER | IRE | NLD | NZ | SWI | UK | US | Certifications | Album |
|---|---|---|---|---|---|---|---|---|---|---|---|---|---|
| "4ever" | 2005 | 2 | 23 | — | 29 | 20 | 83 | 7 | 26 | 17 | — (Note: "4ever" did not enter the Billboard Hot 100, but peaked at number twelve on the Bubbling Under Hot 100 Singles chart.) | ARIA: Platinum; RIAA: Gold; RMNZ: Platinum | The Secret Life Of... |
| "Everything I'm Not" | 2005 | 7 | — | — | — | — | — | 10 | — | — | — | ARIA: Gold | The Secret Life Of... |
| "When It All Falls Apart" | 2006 | 7 | — | — | — | — | 83 | 7 | — | — | — | ARIA: Gold | The Secret Life Of... |
| "Revolution" | 2006 | 18 | — | — | — | — | — | — | — | — | — | | The Secret Life Of... |
| "Leave Me Alone" | 2006 | 41 | — | — | — | — | — | — | — | — | — | | The Secret Life Of... |
| "Hook Me Up" | 2007 | 1 | — | — | — | — | — | — | — | — | — | ARIA: Platinum | Hook Me Up |
| "Untouched" | 2007 | 2 | 23 | 5 | 48 | 1 | 36 | 9 | 34 | 8 | 17 | ARIA: Platinum; BPI: Platinum; RIAA: 2× Platinum; RMNZ: 2× Platinum | Hook Me Up |
| "This Love" | 2008 | 10 | — | — | — | — | — | 14 | — | — | — | ARIA: Gold | Hook Me Up |
| "Take Me on the Floor" | 2008 | 7 | — | 54 | — | — | — | 29 | — | — | 81 | ARIA: Gold | Hook Me Up |
| "Popular" | 2008 | — | — | — | — | — | — | — | — | — | — | | Hook Me Up |
| "Lolita" | 2012 | 23 | — | — | — | — | — | — | — | — | — | ARIA: Gold | Non-album single |
| "You Ruin Me" | 2014 | 1 | — | — | — | 93 | — | 16 | — | 8 | — | ARIA: 3× Platinum; RMNZ: Gold | The Veronicas |
| "If You Love Someone" | 2014 | 5 | — | — | — | — | — | — | — | 98 | — | ARIA: Platinum | The Veronicas |
| "Cruel" | 2015 | 53 | — | — | — | — | — | — | — | — | — | | The Veronicas |
| "Chains" (with Tina Arena and Jessica Mauboy) | 2015 | 14 | — | — | — | — | — | — | — | — | — | | Non-album single |
| "In My Blood" | 2016 | 1 | — | — | — | — | — | 31 | — | — | — | ARIA: 2× Platinum; RMNZ: Platinum | Godzilla |
| "On Your Side" | 2016 | 19 | — | — | — | — | — | — (Note: "On Your Side" did not enter the NZ Top 40 Singles Chart, but peaked at number five on the NZ Heatseeker Singles Chart.) | — | — | — | ARIA: Platinum | Human |
| "The Only High" | 2017 | 41 | — | — | — | — | — | — | — | — | — | | Godzilla |
| "Think of Me" | 2019 | 70 | — | — | — | — | — | — (Note: "Think of Me" did not enter the NZ Top 40 Singles Chart, but peaked at number 22 on the NZ Hot Singles Chart.) | — | — | — | ARIA: Gold | Human |
| "Biting My Tongue" | 2020 | — (Note: "Biting My Tongue" did not enter the ARIA Top 50 Singles Chart, but peaked at number 18 on the Australian Artists Singles Chart.) | — | — | — | — | — | — | — | — | — | | Human |
| "Godzilla" | 2021 | — | — | — | — | — | — | — | — | — | — | | Godzilla |
| "Life of the Party" (featuring Allday) | 2021 | — | — | — | — | — | — | — | — | — | — | | Human |
| "Sugar Daddy" | 2021 | — | — | — | — | — | — | — | — | — | — | | Godzilla |
| "Goodbye" | 2021 | — | — | — | — | — | — | — (Note: "Goodbye" did not enter the NZ Top 40 Singles Chart, but peaked at number 39 on the NZ Hot Singles Chart.) | — | — | — | | Human |
| "Perfect" | 2023 | — | — | — | — | — | — | — | — | — | — | | Gothic Summer |
| "Detox" | 2023 | — | — | — | — | — | — | — | — | — | — | | Gothic Summer |
| "Here to Dance" | 2024 | — | — | — | — | — | — | — | — | — | — | | Gothic Summer |
"—" denotes a recording that did not chart or was not released in that territory.

=== Promotional singles ===
List of promotional singles, showing year released and album name
| Title | Year | Album |
|---|---|---|
| "Ugly" | 2019 | Non-album single |
| "Did Ya Think" (Warner Archives) | 2021 | The Secret Life of... (US limited edition) |
| "12 to 12" (Triple J Like a Version) | 2026 | Non-album single |

=== As featured artist ===
List of singles as featured artist, showing year released and album name
| Title | Year | Album |
|---|---|---|
| "Love the Fall" (Michael Paynter featuring The Veronicas) | 2010 | Weary Stars |
| "Restless" (Allday featuring The Veronicas) | 2019 | Starry Night Over the Phone |

== See also ==
- List of songs recorded by the Veronicas

== Other appearances ==
List of other song appearances, showing year released and album name
| Title | Year | Album | Notes |
|---|---|---|---|
| "Grown-Up Christmas List" | 2010 | The Spirit of Christmas 2010 | Originally recorded by David Foster. |
| "The Wild Side" | 2010 | Hanni & Nanni – Original Motion Picture Soundtrack | Both songs were recorded as part of the soundtrack to Hanni & Nanni. |
| "Us Against the World" | 2010 | Hanni & Nanni – Original Motion Picture Soundtrack | Both songs were recorded as part of the soundtrack to Hanni & Nanni. |

== Videography ==
=== Video albums ===
List of video albums, with selected chart positions and certifications
| Title | Album details | Peak chart position | | Certifications |
| Title | Album details | AUS | AUS DVD | Certifications |
|---|---|---|---|---|
| Exposed... the Secret Life of The Veronicas | Released: 2 December 2006 (AU); Label: Warner, Warner Bros., Sire, EngineRoom; Formats: DVD+CD | — | 3 | ARIA: 2× Platinum |
| Revenge Is Sweeter Tour | Released: 4 September 2009 (AU); Label: Sire, Warner Bros., EngineRoom; Formats: CD+DVD | 91 | — | |
"—" denotes a recording that did not chart or was not released in that territory.

=== Music videos ===
List of music videos, showing year released and director
| Title | Year | Director(s) |
|---|---|---|
| "4ever" (Australian version) | 2005 | Dave Meyers |
| "4ever" | 2005 | Adria Petty and Daniel Kern |
| "Everything I'm Not" | 2005 | Robert Hales |
| "When It All Falls Apart" | 2006 | Robert Hales |
| "Revolution" | 2006 | JT |
| "Hook Me Up" | 2007 | Scott Speer |
| "Untouched" | 2007 | Anthony Rose |
| "This Love" | 2008 | Anthony Rose |
| "Take Me on the Floor" | 2008 | Anthony Rose |
| "Take Me on the Floor" (U.S. version) | 2009 | Cameron Barnett |
| "4ever" (2009 version) | 2009 | Kenneth Cappello |
| "Love The Fall" (with Michael Paynter) | 2010 | Darren McFarlane |
| "Lolita" | 2012 | Spencer Susser |
| "You Ruin Me" | 2014 | Matt Sharp and Tapehead |
| "If You Love Someone" | 2014 | Matt Sharp and Tapehead |
| "Cruel" | 2015 | Matt Sharp and Tapehead |
| "In My Blood" | 2016 | Sasha Samsonova |
| "On Your Side" | 2016 | Ruby Rose |
| "Think of Me" | 2019 | Benn Jae |
| "Restless" (with Allday) | 2019 | Rory Pippan |
| "Biting My Tongue" | 2020 | The Veronicas |
| "Godzilla" | 2021 | Unknown |
| "The Life of the Party" (with Allday) | 2021 | Ribal Hosn |
| "Perfect" | 2023 | |
| "Detox" | 2023 | |
| "Here To Dance" | 2024 | |
