= Revenge Is Sweeter Tour (album) =

Live album by The Veronicas
- Released: 1 September 2009
- Recorded: 24–25 February 2009
- Venue: Palais Theatre, Melbourne, Victoria
- Genre: Synthpop; pop rock; pop punk
- Label: Sire; Warner Bros.; EngineRoom
- Director: Cameron Barnett

The Veronicas chronology
Exposed... the Secret Life of The Veronicas (2006)	Revenge Is Sweeter Tour (2009)	Complete (2009)

The Veronicas video chronology
Exposed... the Secret Life of The Veronicas (2006)	Revenge Is Sweeter Tour (2009)

Revenge Is Sweeter Tour is a video of concert performances by Australian pop rock group The Veronicas. It was shot at the Palais Theatre in Melbourne from 24 to 25 February 2009 during their worldwide Revenge Is Sweeter Tour. The album was also released in the United States with only one thousand copies issued through the group's website.

== Track listing ==
No.	Title	Writer(s)	Length
1.	"Take Me on the Floor"	Toby Gad; Jessica Origliasso; Lisa Origliasso	4:38
2.	"Everything"	J. Origliasso; L. Origliasso; Robert J. Guariglia; Paul De Vincenzo; Jungle George; Vik Foxx	3:33
3.	"Popular"	Gad; Beni Barca; J. Origliasso; L. Origliasso	3:02
4.	"Mouth Shut"	Gad; J. Origliasso; L. Origliasso	3:41
5.	"Revolution"	Raine Maida; Chantal Kreviazuk	4:15
6.	"Revenge Is Sweeter (Than You Ever Were)"	Gad; J. Origliasso; L. Origliasso	3:40
7.	"Secret"	Gad; J. Origliasso; L. Origliasso	3:19
8.	"Mother Mother"	Tracy Bonham	3:35
9.	"Hook Me Up"	Greg Wells; Shelly Peiken; J. Origliasso; L. Origliasso	3:19
10.	"This Love"	Gad; Kesha (k$) Sebert	3:27
11.	"Heavily Broken"	Eric Nova; J. Origliasso; L. Origliasso	5:04
12.	"4ever"	Max Martin; Lukasz "Dr. Luke" Gottwald	5:56
13.	"Everything I'm Not"	Martin; Rami; Gottwald; J. Origliasso; L. Origliasso	3:52
14.	"All I Have"	Gad; J. Origliasso; L. Origliasso	3:24
15.	"When It All Falls Apart"	Josh Alexander; Billy Steinberg; J. Origliasso; L. Origliasso	4:00
16.	"Untouched"	Gad; J. Origliasso; L. Origliasso	4:34
17.	"This Is How It Feels"	Gad; J. Origliasso; L. Origliasso	4:46

DVD
No.	Title	Length
18.	"Backstage"	22:33

== Chart performance ==
The album charted and peaked at number ninety-one on the ARIA Albums chart where it stayed for three weeks.

Chart (2009)	Peak position
Australian ARIA Albums Chart	91
