= List of the Veronicas concert tours =

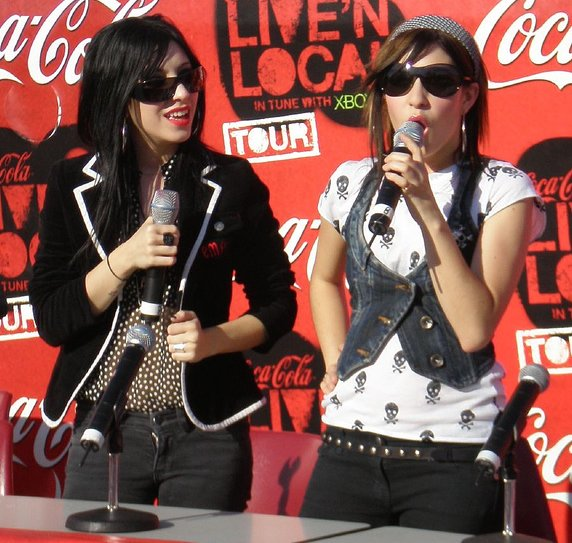
The Veronicas being interviewed on tour in Perth in 2006.

This is a complete list of tours by Australian band the Veronicas. As of 2022, they have headlined six national tours in Australia, two international tours and have supported six other tours. They have also done many mini tours.

== 2006 US Tour ==
The Veronicas 2006 US Tour
- Tour by The Veronicas
- Associated album: The Secret Life of...
- Start date: 28 January 2006
- End date: 3 March 2006
- No. of shows: 27

The Veronicas concert chronology
- The Veronicas 2006 US Tour (2006); Australian Tour 2006 (2006)

The US tour was their first ever headlining tour. The tour was in support of their first album The Secret Life of.... The tour began on 28 January 2006 and finished 3 March 2006. The supporting acts were October Fall and Jonas Brothers.

=== Tour dates ===
Date	City	Country	Venue
28 January 2006	Sacramento	United States	Underground Cafe
30 January 2006	Seattle	United States	The Crocodile
31 January 2006	Portland	United States	Roseland Grill
2 February 2006	Fort Collins	United States	The Starlight
3 February 2006	Denver	United States	Rock Island
4 February 2006	Kansas City	United States	Madrid Theatre
5 February 2006	Columbia	United States	Mojo's
6 February 2006	Minneapolis	United States	7th Street Entry
8 February 2006	Chicago	United States	Beat Kitchen
9 February 2006	Indianapolis	United States	The Emerson Theater
11 February 2006	Columbus	United States	The Basement
12 February 2006	Buffalo	United States	Town Ballroom
14 February 2006	New York City	United States	Avalon Nightclub
15 February 2006	Worcester	United States	The Palladium
16 February 2006	Providence	United States	Living Room
17 February 2006	Hartford	United States	Webster Underground
18 February 2006	Washington, D.C.	United States	9:30 Club
20 February 2006	Philadelphia	United States	North Star
21 February 2006	Wilkes-Barre	United States	Cafe Metropolis
23 February 2006	Charlotte	United States	The Casbah
24 February 2006	Norfolk	United States	Norva
25 February 2006	Charleston	United States	Music Farm
27 February 2006	Nashville	United States	3rd & Lindsley
28 February 2006	Atlanta	United States	Masquerade
1 March 2006	Gainesville	United States	Common Grounds
2 March 2006	Tampa	United States	State Theatre
3 March 2006	Orlando	United States	Back Booth

=== Setlist ===
(Not same setlist for all dates)

1. "Revolution"
2. "Everything I'm Not"
3. "Leave Me Alone"
4. "When it All Falls Apart"
5. "Cry"
6. "Heavily Broken"
7. "Mother Mother"
8. "4ever"
9. "I Could Get Used To This"

== Australian Tour 2006 ==
Australian Tour 2006
- Tour by The Veronicas
- Associated album: The Secret Life of...
- Start date: 13 April 2006
- End date: 24 April 2006
- No. of shows: 9

The Veronicas concert chronology
- The Veronicas 2006 US Tour (2006); Australian Tour 2006 (2006); The Revolution Tour (2006)

The Australian Tour was their first ever tour in Australia. The nine date tour commenced on 13 April 2006 in Newcastle and concluded on 24 April 2006. The supporting act was Elemeno P. All the shows were sell outs.

=== Tour dates ===
Date	City	Country	Venue
13 April 2006	Newcastle	Australia	The Civic Theatre
15 April 2006	Wollongong	Australia	Yallah Roadhouse
16 April 2006	Penrith	Australia	The Evan Theatre
18 April 2006	Sydney	Australia	The Metro Theatre
19 April 2006	Sydney	Australia	The Metro Theatre
21 April 2006	Brisbane	Australia	The Tivoli
22 April 2006	Melbourne	Australia	The Palais
23 April 2006	Adelaide	Australia	Her Majesteys
24 April 2006	Perth	Australia	Capitol

== The Revolution Tour ==
The Revolution Tour
- Tour by The Veronicas
- Associated album: The Secret Life of...
- Start date: 4 August 2006
- End date: 27 August 2006
- Legs: 1
- No. of shows: 15

The Veronicas concert chronology
- Australian Tour 2006 (2006); The Revolution Tour (2006); Hook Me Up Tour (2007)

The Revolution Tour is the Veronicas second Australian tour and was announced in June, 2006. This tour marked one year since they released their first single, "4ever", in 2005. The tour commenced on 4 August and finished on 27 August 2006. Supporting acts were originally Avalon Drive and Ryan Cabrera but Cabrera dropped out of the tour due to his split from Veronicas twin Lisa.

=== Tour dates ===
Date	City	Country	Venue
4 August 2006	Perth	Australia	Burswood Theatre
6 August 2006	Adelaide	Australia	Thebarton Theatre
8 August 2006	Newcastle	Australia	Newcastle Entertainment Centre
9 August 2006	Wollongong	Australia	WIN Entertainment Centre
10 August 2006	Sydney	Australia	Luna Park
12 August 2006	Gold Coast	Australia	Gold Coast Convention Centre
15 August 2006	Brisbane	Australia	Brisbane Convention & Exhibition Centre
17 August 2006	Cairns	Australia	Cairns Convention Centre
18 August 2006	Townsville	Australia	Townsville Entertainment Centre
20 August 2006	Rockhampton	Australia	Great Western Hotel
22 August 2006	Toowoomba	Australia	USQ Clive Berghofer Recreation Centre
24 August 2006	Melbourne	Australia	Palais Theatre
25 August 2006	Bendigo	Australia	Bendigo Schweppes Centre
26 August 2006	Melbourne	Australia	Palais Theatre
27 August 2006	Geelong	Australia	The Arena

=== Setlist ===
(not same setlist for all dates)

1. "Secret"
2. "Everything I'm Not"
3. "Happy"
4. "Mouth Shut"
5. "When It All Falls Apart"
6. "Did Ya Think"
7. "Faded"
8. "Nobody Wins"
9. "It's a Long Way to the Top (If You Wanna Rock 'n' Roll)" (AC/DC)
10. "Cry"
11. "Speechless"
12. "Mother Mother"
13. "Heavily Broken"
14. "Wannabe" (Spice Girls)
15. "Leave Me Alone"
16. "Revolution"

Encore

1. "4ever"
2. "I Could Get Used To This"

=== Exposed... The Secret Life of The Veronicas ===
On 2 December 2006 the Veronicas released a CD/DVD, entitled Exposed... The Secret Life of The Veronicas in Australia which featured live performances from the Revolution Tour and a DVD featuring parts of the sisters' live performances throughout 2005–2006, including footage that had previously not been seen, and their music videos. The album debuted at #6 on the ARIA DVD Charts accrediting platinum in its first week. The second week it rose to its peak of #3 and was accredited Double Platinum.

== Hook Me Up Tour ==
Hook Me Up Tour
- Tour by The Veronicas
- Associated album: Hook Me Up
- Start date: 30 November 2007
- End date: 12 December 2007
- Legs: 1
- No. of shows: 10

The Veronicas concert chronology
- The Revolution Tour (2006); Hook Me Up Tour (2007); Revenge Is Sweeter Tour (2009)

The Hook Me Up Tour is the Veronicas third national tour of Australia supporting their second album Hook Me Up. The tour went for 10 shows beginning on 30 November 2007 and finishing on 12 December 2007. The supporting acts for the tour were Dean Geyer and Calerway.

=== Tour dates ===
Date	City	Country	Venue
30 November 2007	Perth	Australia	Burswood Theatre
1 December 2007	Perth	Australia	Burswood Theatre
3 December 2007	Adelaide	Australia	Thebarton Theatre
4 December 2007	Adelaide	Australia	Thebarton Theatre
6 December 2007	Melbourne	Australia	Festival Hall
7 December 2007	Sydney	Australia	Hordern Pavilion
8 December 2007	Wollongong	Australia	WIN Entertainment Centre
9 December 2007	Newcastle	Australia	Newcastle Entertainment Centre
11 December 2007	Brisbane	Australia	Brisbane Entertainment Centre
12 December 2007	Gold Coast	Australia	Gold Coast Convention Centre

== Revenge Is Sweeter Tour ==
Revenge Is Sweeter Tour
- Tour by The Veronicas
- Associated album: Hook Me Up
- Start date: 13 February 2009
- End date: 9 August 2009
- Legs: 4
- No. of shows: 54

The Veronicas concert chronology
- Hook Me Up Tour (2007); Revenge Is Sweeter Tour (2009); Sanctified Tour (2014)

The Revenge Is Sweeter Tour is a tour by the Veronicas which was announced in November 2008.

=== Tour information ===
The sixteen date tour was their first to extend outside of Australia into New Zealand. The tour began on 13 February 2009 in Newcastle and concluded on 7 March 2009 in Dunedin, New Zealand.

On 3 April 2009 they announced the tour would continue with a United States leg starting on 4 June 2009 and ending on 18 July 2009 and then continuing in Japan from 7 to 9 August 2009. On 5 May 2009 it was announced that there would be two shows in Canada, one on 27 June and the other on 15 July, before heading to Japan.

While on a promotional visit to the United Kingdom in August 2009, they announced 3 United Kingdom dates of the tour from 23–25 September 2009. A CD/DVD version of the tour was released on 1 September 2009 in Australia. After the tour ended, they played their first show in Latin America on Los Premios MTV Latinoamérica 2009 in Bogotá, Colombia.

=== Supporting acts ===
- Short Stack (Australia)
- Metro Station (Australia and New Zealand)
- Midnight Youth (New Zealand)
- P Money (New Zealand)
- Angry Anderson (Guest performer on 19 February in Sydney)
- The Pretty Reckless (USA) (select venues)
- Carney (USA/Canada) (select venues)
- The Federals (UK) (All Venues)

=== Tour dates ===
Date	City	Country	Venue
Oceania
13 February 2009	Newcastle	Australia	Newcastle Entertainment Centre
14 February 2009	Brisbane	Australia	Brisbane Entertainment Centre
16 February 2009	Sydney	Australia	Enmore Theatre
17 February 2009	Sydney	Australia	Enmore Theatre
19 February 2009	Sydney	Australia	Enmore Theatre
20 February 2009	Wollongong	Australia	WIN Entertainment Centre
21 February 2009	Canberra	Australia	Royal Theatre
24 February 2009	Melbourne	Australia	Palais Theatre
25 February 2009	Melbourne	Australia	Palais Theatre
26 February 2009	Adelaide	Australia	Thebarton Theatre
28 February 2009	Perth	Australia	Challenge Stadium
1 March 2009	Perth	Australia	Challenge Stadium
3 March 2009	Auckland	New Zealand	Logan Campbell Centre
4 March 2009	Wellington	New Zealand	TSB Bank Arena
6 March 2009	Christchurch	New Zealand	Christchurch Town Hall
7 March 2009	Dunedin	New Zealand	Dunedin Town Hall
North America
3 June 2009	Buffalo	United States	Coca-Cola Field; WKSE radio show
4 June 2009	Providence	United States	Lupos
7 June 2009	Wappingers Falls	United States	Dutchess Stadium
9 June 2009	Norfolk	United States	The NorVa
10 June 2009	Greenville	United States	Handlebar
12 June 2009	New Orleans	United States	House of Blues
13 June 2009	Baton Rouge	United States	Varsity
14 June 2009	Memphis	United States	Hi Tone
16 June 2009	Oklahoma City	United States	Diamond Ballroom
17 June 2009	Dallas	United States	House of Blues
20 June 2009	Kansas City	United States	Capitol Fed Park
21 June 2009	San Francisco	United States	Golden Gate Park
23 June 2009	Los Angeles	United States	Henry Fonda Theater
24 June 2009	Vallejo	United States	Six Flags
26 June 2009	Portland	United States	Hawthorne Theatre
27 June 2009	Vancouver	Canada	The Plaza Nightclub
28 June 2009	Seattle	United States	Neumos
30 June 2009	Salt Lake City	United States	Club Sound
1 July 2009	Colorado Springs	United States	Black Sheep
3 July 2009	Bessemer	United States	Adventure Theme Park
4 July 2009	Detroit	United States	CityFest
5 July 2009	Milwaukee	United States	Summerfest
7 July 2009	St. Louis	United States	Pops
8 July 2009	Des Moines	United States	People's Court
10 July 2009	Minneapolis	United States	Station 4
11 July 2009	Chicago	United States	Metro
12 July 2009	Grand Rapids	United States	Intersection
14 July 2009	Cleveland	United States	Grog Shop
15 July 2009	Toronto	Canada	CiRCA
17 July 2009	Philadelphia	United States	Fillmore at the TLA
18 July 2009	Denver	United States	PARC-Elitch Gardens
1 August 2009	Binghamton	United States	Otsiningo Park
Asia
7 August 2009	Osaka	Japan	Summer Sonic Festival
8 August 2009	Tokyo	Japan	Summer Sonic Festival
9 August 2009	Tokyo	Japan	Summer Sonic Festival
Europe
23 September 2009	Glasgow	Scotland	O2 ABC Glasgow
24 September 2009	London	England	KOKO
25 September 2009	Manchester	England	Manchester Academy
6 December 2009	London	England	The O2 Arena; Jingle Bell Ball

=== Critical reception ===
The tour received mostly positive reviews commenting on the crowd atmosphere and their vocal abilities.

GenQ stated "...the girls were on stage for 1 ½ hours of entertainment in every sense of the word".

The Courier Mail gave a positive review saying "There was plenty of sass, not to mention skin-tight sequined pants, multiple costume changes and lashings of red lipstick, but the girls' big voices were the main attraction" as well as commenting on their performance of 'Heavily Broken' stating "Their emotion-laden ballad Heavily Broken, dedicated to the victims of Victoria's Bushfires, was the only thing that could draw silence from the crowd" and ended it with a comment on the shows family friendly nature saying "If the applause was any indicator, Saturday night's crowd - mums and dads included - were proud of their local girls done good".

Adelaide Now reviewed their performance at the Thebarton Theatre and commented on their stage presence saying "With a string quartet brought in for some songs, back-up dancers for others, the Veronicas delivered a varied and energy filled set"

=== Set list ===
(not same setlist for all dates)

1. "Take Me on the Floor"
2. "Everything"
3. "Popular"
4. "Mouth Shut"
5. "Revolution"
6. "Revenge Is Sweeter (Than You Ever Were)"
7. "Secret"^{1}
8. "Mother Mother"
9. "Hook Me Up"
10. "This Love"
11. "Don't Say Goodbye"
12. "Heavily Broken"
13. "4ever"
14. "Everything I'm Not"
15. "I Could Get Used to This"^{2}
16. "All I Have"^{3}
17. "When It All Falls Apart"^{4}
18. "Untouched"
19. "This Is How It Feels"
- ^Note 1: Performed in Australia, New Zealand and United States only.
- ^Note 2: Performed in Australia and New Zealand only.
- ^Note 3: Performed in Australia, New Zealand and United States only.
- ^Note 4: Performed in Australia, Scotland and New Zealand only.

== Sanctified Tour ==
=== Sanctified Tour ===
Sanctified Tour
- Tour by The Veronicas
- Location: Australia and United Kingdom
- Associated album: The Veronicas
- Start date: 12 February 2015
- End date: 11 March 2015
- Legs: 2
- No. of shows: 10

The Veronicas concert chronology
- Revenge Is Sweeter Tour (2009); Sanctified Tour (2015)

On 19 November 2014, the Veronicas announced via their official Twitter account that they will embark on a month-long Australian tour to promote The Veronicas in 2015. The tour is set to begin on 12 February 2015 in Perth and end on 21 February in Brisbane. An announcement on 19 January revealed that the Sanctified Tour dates will include shows in the UK from 6–11 March with support from Los Angeles-based band Badflower. They announced the American leg in May. The duo cancelled the American leg of the tour due to technical issues in June.

List of concerts, showing date, city, country, venue, opening act,
Date	City	Country	Venue	Opening act
Australia
12 February 2015	Perth	Australia	Perth Concert Hall	Dean Ray
14 February 2015	Adelaide	Australia	Adelaide Entertainment Centre Theatre	—N/a
18 February 2015	Melbourne	Australia	Hamer Hall	Dean Ray
20 February 2015	Sydney	Australia	Enmore Theatre	Dean Ray
21 February 2015	Brisbane	Australia	Brisbane City Hall	Dean Ray
Europe
4 March 2015	Birmingham	England	Library, The Institute	BadFlower
6 March 2015	Glasgow	Scotland	Garage Glasgow	BadFlower
8 March 2015	Manchester	England	Manchester Academy	BadFlower
10 March 2015	Brighton	England	Brighton Concorde 2	BadFlower
11 March 2015	London	England	Heaven in London	BadFlower
North America
17 June 2015	~~Buffalo~~ cancelled	United States	Buffalo and Erie County Botanical Gardens	BadFlower
21 June 2015	~~Columbus~~ cancelled	United States	Newport Music Hall	BadFlower
24 June 2015	~~Washington, D.C.~~ cancelled	United States	The Hamilton Live	BadFlower
26 June 2015	~~Nashville~~ cancelled	United States	Public Square Park Downtown	BadFlower
27 June 2015	~~Nashville~~ cancelled	United States	Public Square Park Downtown	BadFlower
29 June 2015	~~West Hollywood~~ cancelled	United States	Troubadour	BadFlower

=== Setlist ===
(not same setlist for all dates)

1. "Sanctified"
2. "Did You Miss Me? (I'm A Veronica)"
3. "Take Me on the Floor"
4. "Line of Fire"
5. "Hook Me Up"
6. "Revenge Is Sweeter (Than You Ever Were)"
7. "Teenage Millionaire"
8. "Always"
9. "Let Me Out"
10. "Everything I'm Not"
11. "You Ruin Me"
12. "Untouched"
13. "Cruel"
14. "Cold"
15. "This Is How It Feels"
16. "4ever"
17. "You and Me"
18. "If You Love Someone"

== Godzilla V Human Tour ==
The Godzilla V Human tour is The Veronicas seventh concert tour. The tour was announced on March 26, 2021. to support the Human / Godzilla double album. They continued joining festivals and mini performances well into 2023.

Tour dates

List of concerts, showing date, city, country, venue, opening act,
Date	City	Venue	Opening Act
Australia
3 June 2021	Brisbane	Fortitude Music Hall	Zheani
4 June 2021	Brisbane	Fortitude Music Hall	Zheani
5 June 2021	Sunshine Coast	Kings Theatre	Zheani
6 June 2021	Tweed Heads	Twin Towns	Joel Adams
12 June 2021	Perth	HBF Stadium	Supathick
13 June 2021	Adelaide	Thebarton Theatre	Zheani
15 June 2021	Canberra	Canberra Theatre	CXLOE
16 June 2021	Newcastle	Civic Theatre	CXLOE MAY-A
18 June 2021	Sydney	Hordern Pavilion	CXLOE MAY-A
19 June 2021	Wollongong	WIN Entertainment Centre	CXLOE MAY-A
26 June 2021	Melbourne	The Forum	CXLOE
27 June 2021	Melbourne	The Forum	Zheani
28 June 2021	Melbourne	The Forum	Zheani

=== Setlist ===
(Not same setlist for all dates)

1. "GODZILLA"
2. "When It All Falls Apart"
3. "Take Me on the Floor"
4. "Revenge Is Sweeter (Then You Ever Were)"
5. "Stealing Cars"
6. "Silent"
7. "Hook Me Up"
8. "This Is How It Feels"
9. "Human"
10. "Heavily Broken" (Sometimes "Without You" from "Human")
11. "Everything I'm Not"
12. "In My Blood"
13. "Sugar Daddy"
14. "Lolita"
15. "4ever"
16. "You Ruin Me"
17. "Untouched"

== Gothic Summer North America Tour ==
The Veroncias did their first American tour in just over 10 years, to support their Rock Pop album Gothic Summer which came out that year. Jesse Jo Stark opened.

=== Tour dates ===
Date	City	Country	Venue
2 April 2024	San Francisco, CA	United States	The Filmore
5 April 2024	Seattle, WA	United States	The Showbox
6 April 2024	Portland, OR	United States	The Alladin Theatre
9 April 2006	Salt Lake City, UT	United States	The Complex
10 April 2024	Denver, CO	United States	Summit
12 April 2024	Minneapolis, MN	United States	Varsity Theatre
13 April 2024	Milwaukee, WI	United States	The Rave
14 April 2024	Chicago, IL	United States	House Of Blues
16 April 2024	Detroit, MI	United States	St. Andrews Court
17 April 2024	Columbus, OH	United States	Newport Music Hall
19 April 2024	Philadelphia, PA	United States	Theatre Of Living Arts
20 April 2024	Washington DC	United States	The Fillmore
21 April 2024	Boston, MA	United States	Royale
22 April 2024	New York, NY	United States	Irving Plaza
24 April 2024	Atlanta, GA	United States	The Masquerade
26 April 2024	Fort Lauderdale, Florida	United States	Revolution Live
27 April 2024	Orlando, Florida	United States	House Of Blues
28 April 2024	Tampa, Florida	United States	The Rits Bor
30 April 2024	Dallas, Texas	United States	The Echo
1 May 2024	Houston, Texas	United States	White House
4 May 2024	Las Vegas, NV	United States	House Of Blues
5 May 2024	Los Angeles, CA	United States	The Fonda

=== Set List ===
(Not setlist for all dates)

1. Take Me on The Floor
2. When It All Falls Apart
3. Everything I'm Not
4. Detox
5. Hook Me Up
6. Revenge Is Sweeter (Than You Ever Were)
7. This Love
8. Ribcage
9. You Ruin Me
10. Lolita
11. Invisible
12. This is How It Feels
13. In My Blood
14. Jungle
15. How to Dance
16. Untouched

== As supporting acts ==
- In late 2005, the Veronicas supported American musician Ryan Cabrera on a tour through the US along with the Click Five.
- In June 2006 the Veronicas were an opening act (along with Ashley Parker Angel) for the Ashlee Simpson US summer tour, but after the first few shows Lisa and Jess had to pull out after Lisa became ill with throat nodules and needed surgery.
- The Veronicas supported Natasha Bedingfield on her 20 date US tour that started on 21 May 2008 in Myrtle Beach and ended on 10 July in San Francisco, Kate Voegele was also a supporting artist on the tour.
- The Veronicas supported American pop-rock band the Jonas Brothers for the last leg of their Burnin' Up Tour. in 2008.
- The Veronicas supported Hanson along with Everybody Else on Hanson's 2008 Walk Around the World Tour from September to November.
- In 2010, the Veronicas were to be supporting acts for Kelly Clarkson's "All I Ever Wanted Fall Tour," but dropped out being replaced by Eric Hutchinson.
- The Veronicas were supporting 5 Seconds of Summer on the In Phoenix and LA pre tour dates of their Rock Out with Your Socks Out Tour in late 2014.
- Cyndi Lauper's Girls Just Wanna Have Fun Farewell Tour, in April 2025, in Australia.

=== Non-affiliated tours ===
- Pre toured their third album in the period 2010-2012
- Did an acoustic tour in America in 2015 with a radio company
- Pride tour 2019 to LA, Chicago and New York 2019
- Did misc festivals in Australia in 2019
- Regularly played festivals on-off during their career especially 2005-2009 and 2019, 2021-
