= Exposed... the Secret Life of The Veronicas =

Exposed... The Secret Life of The Veronicas

Live album including DVD by The Veronicas
- Released: 2 December 2006
- Recorded: 2006
- Genre: Pop rock
- Label: Warner Music

The Veronicas chronology
The Veronicas: Mtv.com Live EP (2006)	Exposed... The Secret Life of The Veronicas (2006)	Hook Me Up (2007)

Exposed... The Secret Life of The Veronicas is a CD/DVD release from Australian pop rock duo, the Veronicas, released in Australia on 2 December 2006.

The DVD features a rockumentary, which covers the girls' wild ride in music, including everything from their story from 2005 to 2006, never before seen footage and music videos of "4ever", "Everything I'm Not", "When It All Falls Apart" and "Revolution". The CD features live performances from the Australian 2006 Revolution tour.

The release made its debut at number six on the Australian DVD Chart and was certified Platinum by ARIA. In its second week it moved up three spots to number three and achieved double platinum status.

== Track listing ==
=== Disc 1: DVD ===
1. Exposed... The Secret Life of The Veronicas documentary

Live performances

1. "Everything I'm Not"
2. "When It All Falls Apart"
3. "Speechless"
4. "Mouth Shut"
5. "Mother Mother"
6. "4ever"

Music videos

1. The Introduction
2. "4ever"
3. "Everything I'm Not"
4. "When It All Falls Apart"
5. "Revolution"
6. Bonus material: On Tour with The Veronicas

=== Disc 2: CD Live in Australia 2006 Revolution Tour ===
1. "4ever"
2. "Everything I'm Not"
3. "When It All Falls Apart"
4. "Revolution"
5. "Leave Me Alone"
6. "Heavily Broken"

== Charts ==
Chart (2006)	Peak position
ARIA Top 40 DVD Chart	3

== Certifications ==
Region	Certification	Certified units/sales
Australia (ARIA)	2× Platinum	30,000^{^}
^{^} Shipments figures based on certification alone.
