= MTV Australia Video Music Awards 2007 =

Annual Australian music awards ceremony

2007 MTV Australia Video Music Awards
- Date: 29 April 2007
- Location: Acer Arena, Sydney
- Hosted by: Fergie & Good Charlotte
- Website: mtv.com.au/avma

Television/radio coverage
- Network: MTV Australia

The MTV Australia Video Music Awards 2007 was broadcast live from Acer Arena on 29 April 2007 on MTV Australia. It was then repeated on the Ten Network on 6 May 2007.

The hosts for the awards were Fergie, along with Good Charlotte, while Sophie Monk who hosted the red carpet show and stars such as Pink and Thirty Seconds to Mars and special guest Kristin Cavallari from Laguna Beach also appeared. Also, the cast from the MTV series Dirty Sanchez presented.

In the awards new categories were added such as "Best Hook Up Video", "Download of the Year" and New Zealand Viewers Choice and "Sexiest Video" has been re-introduced to the categories after its absence from the 2006 show. Also, the "Video Vanguard" award was introduced to the Australian Awards for the first time which honoured Australian band Silverchair.

== Performers ==
- Thirty Seconds to Mars — "The Kill"
- Good Charlotte — "Dance Floor Anthem"/"Keep Your Hands off My Girl"
- Pink — "U + Ur Hand"/"Sweet Dreams"/"Get the Party Started"
- Teddy Geiger — "These Walls"
- Damien Leith — "Night of My Life"
- Eskimo Joe — "Black Fingernails, Red Wine"
- Evermore — "Light Surrounding You"
- Sneaky Sound System — "UFO"
- Silverchair — "Straight Lines"
- Stephanie McIntosh — "So Do I Say Sorry First?"
- Fergie — "Glamorous"
- TV Rock and Dukes of Windsor — "The Others"
- Billy Talent — "Fallen Leaves"
- Juke Kartel — "Throw It Away"

== Nominees and winners ==
The winners are in bold.

=== Video of the Year ===
- Christina Aguilera — "Ain't No Other Man"
- Wolfmother — "Joker and the Thief"
- **Thirty Seconds to Mars — "The Kill"**
- My Chemical Romance — "Welcome to the Black Parade"
- Justin Timberlake — "What Goes Around.../...Comes Around
- Silverchair — "Straight Lines"
- Beyoncé — "Irreplaceable"

=== Album of the Year ===
- Pink — I'm Not Dead
- Eskimo Joe — Black Fingernails, Red Wine
- Justin Timberlake — FutureSex/LoveSounds
- Red Hot Chili Peppers — Stadium Arcadium
- The Killers — Sam's Town
- **Evanescence — The Open Door**

=== Best Male Artist ===
- Justin Timberlake — "What Goes Around.../...Comes Around
- **Shannon Noll — "Lonely"**
- Jay-Z — "Show Me What You Got"
- Damien Leith — "Night of My Life"
- Robbie Williams — "Lovelight"
- Akon — "Smack That"

=== Best Female Artist ===
- **Pink** — **"U + Ur Hand"**
- Fergie — "Fergalicious"
- Christina Aguilera — "Ain't No Other Man"
- Beyoncé — "Irreplaceable"
- Nelly Furtado — "Promiscuous"
- Gwen Stefani — "Wind It Up"

=== Best Group ===
- Wolfmother — "Joker and the Thief"
- Good Charlotte — "Keep Your Hands off My Girl"
- Eskimo Joe — "Black Fingernails, Red Wine"
- **Red Hot Chili Peppers — "Dani California"**
- Silverchair — "Straight Lines"
- Panic! at the Disco — "Lying Is the Most Fun a Girl Can Have Without Taking Her Clothes Off"

=== Spankin' New Artist ===
- Stephanie McIntosh — "Mistake"
- Lily Allen — "Smile"
- Damien Leith — "Night of My Life"
- **Teddy Geiger — "For You I Will (Confidence)"**
- The Lost Gospel — "Secret Agent"
- Ne-Yo — "So Sick"

=== Best Rock Video ===
- Eskimo Joe — "Black Fingernails, Red Wine"
- **Thirty Seconds to Mars — "The Kill"**
- Jet — "Rip It Up"
- Good Charlotte — "Keep Your Hands off My Girl"
- Wolfmother — "Joker and the Thief"
- My Chemical Romance — "Welcome to the Black Parade"

=== Best Pop Video ===
- Christina Aguilera — "Ain't No Other Man"
- **Guy Sebastian — "Elevator Love"**
- Gwen Stefani — "Wind It Up"
- Justin Timberlake — "What Goes Around.../...Comes Around Interlude"
- The Veronicas — "Revolution"
- Pink — "U + Ur Hand"

=== Best Dance Video ===
- David Guetta vs The Egg — "Love Don't Let Me Go (Walking Away)"
- Rogue Traders — "In Love Again"
- Bob Sinclar — "Rock This Party (Everybody Dance Now)"
- Sneaky Sound System — "Pictures"
- Bodyrox — "Yeah Yeah"
- **Fedde le Grand — "Put Your Hands Up 4 Detroit"**

=== Best Hip Hop Video ===
- Hilltop Hoods — "The Hard Road"
- Lupe Fiasco — "Kick, Push"
- **Snoop Dogg feat. R. Kelly — "That's That"**
- Chamillionaire — "Ridin'"
- Akon feat. Eminem — "Smack That"
- Fergie — "London Bridge"

=== Sexiest Video ===
- **Fergie — "Fergalicious"**
- Justin Timberlake — "SexyBack"
- Nelly Furtado — "Maneater"
- The Pussycat Dolls — "I Don't Need a Man"
- Fedde le Grand — "Put Your Hands Up for Detroit"
- Beyoncé feat. Jay-Z — "Déjà Vu"

=== Best Hook Up ===
- **Justin Timberlake feat. Timbaland — "SexyBack"**
- Diddy and Christina Aguilera — "Tell Me"
- Akon feat. Eminem — "Smack That"
- The Pussycat Dolls feat. Snoop Dogg — "Buttons"
- U2 and Green Day — "The Saints Are Coming"
- Beyoncé feat. Jay-Z — "Déjà Vu"

=== Download of the Year ===
- **Pink — "Who Knew"**
- Youth Group — "Forever Young"
- AFI — "Miss Murder"
- Eskimo Joe — "Black Fingernails, Red Wine"
- Rihanna — "SOS"
- Snow Patrol — "Chasing Cars"

=== Video Vanguard Award ===
- **Silverchair**

=== Viewers Choice Australia ===
- **Good Charlotte**

=== Viewers Choice New Zealand ===
- **Goodnight Nurse**

== Snoop Dogg controversy ==
Snoop Dogg was due to attend the ceremony, but the Department of Immigration and Citizenship cancelled his visa on the basis of "character" issues. Minister for Immigration, Kevin Andrews cited numerous drug and assault offences to back up his decision. The decision has been highly controversial, especially amongst MTV and Snoop Dogg fans.

In protest, MTV Australia had created a website to gather interest and to help Dogg attain Australian Citizenship.

== Award moments ==
- Darren McMullen lifted his kilt exposing his buttocks.
- While Nicole Richie was announcing the winner of the award for Best Male Artist, she miss pronounced the winners name saying Sha-NON Noll instead of the correct Shannon Noll.
- During a broadcast backstage interview, The Veronicas told viewers that they had a so-called "crush" on the 2006 winner of Australian Idol, Damien Leith. When the girls were interviewed again they stated that Leith's wife had confronted them shortly after they made that remark.
- Also in The Veronica's backstage interview, Andrew Hansen from The Chaser's War on Everything did something for the show, he acted as a journalist about to ask a question but broke out into a song.
