= Leave Me Alone (The Veronicas song) =

2006 single by the Veronicas

Single by the Veronicas

from the album The Secret Life of...
- Released: 4 November 2006
- Length: 3:32
- Label: Sire
- Songwriters: Josh Alexander; Jessica Origliasso; Lisa Origliasso; Billy Steinberg
- Producers: Josh Alexander; Billy Steinberg

The Veronicas singles chronology
"Revolution" (2006)	"Leave Me Alone" (2006)	"Hook Me Up" (2007)

"Leave Me Alone" is a song written by Josh Alexander, Jessica Origliasso, Lisa Origliasso and Billy Steinberg, produced by Alexander and Steinberg for the Veronicas' debut album, The Secret Life of... (2005). "Leave Me Alone" was released as the fifth and final single from the album and coincided with the release of their live album, Exposed... The Secret Life of The Veronicas. The single reached number 41 on the Australian ARIA Singles Chart. No music video was produced for the release of the single.

== Track listing ==
1. "Leave Me Alone" – 3:32
2. "4ever" (Claude Le Gache mixshow) – 5:43
3. "Everything I'm Not" (Eddie Baez mix – edit) – 4:29

== Charts ==
Weekly chart performance for "Leave Me Alone"
Chart (2006)	Peak position
Australia (ARIA)	41
