= MTV Australia Awards =

Australia's first awards show to celebrate both local and international acts

- Current: MTV Australia Awards 2009
- Awarded for: Best in music
- Country: Australia
- Presented by: MTV Australia
- First award: 2005
- Final award: 2009
- Website: http://www.mtvawards.com.au/

Television/radio coverage
- Network: MTV Australia

The MTV Australia Awards (previously known as the MTV Australia Video Music Awards or AVMA's) started in 2005 and were Australia's first awards show to celebrate both local and international acts. The last edition took place in 2009.

== History ==
The MTV Australia Video Music Awards were announced in 2004 as the seventeenth country to host its own MTV award show, with nominees being announced in December of that year. The inaugural show premiered on 3 March 2005 at Luna Park Sydney, Australia, and was hosted by The Osbournes, featuring numerous guest stars, nominees, performers, and presenters. The second AVMA (held at Acer Arena) was hosted by Ashlee Simpson. The third annual Australian Video Music Awards took place at Acer Arena, with hosts Fergie (from the Black Eyed Peas) and Good Charlotte, as well as MTV's Laguna Beach star, Kristin Cavallari. The MTV Mile High Gig made its debut in celebration of the launch of MTV New Zealand's Viewer's Choice which flew Kiwi fans via Air New Zealand to the awards show with live music guests on the plane. In 2008 the show's name was changed to MTV Australia Awards (or MTVAA's), accompanied by a new format to the awards with the introduction of the categories Best Australian and New Zealand artist awards, Video of the Year, Good and Bad Karma Awards, Television moment, Live Performance award and Re-Make award, with the show being hosted by Wyclef Jean. The MTV New Zealand Mile High Gig made its return with Dizzee Rascal and Scribe headlining the event. In 2010, MTV Networks Australia announced it would launch MTV Classic. A music event will be held for the channel May launch and will replace the MTV awards show for the year.

== Award locations ==
- 3 March 2005 – Big Top Sydney hosted by The Osbournes
- 12 April 2006 – Acer Arena, Sydney hosted by Ashlee Simpson
- 29 April 2007 – Acer Arena, Sydney hosted by Fergie and Joel Madden and Benji Madden from Good Charlotte
- 26 April 2008 – Australian Technology Park, Sydney hosted by Wyclef Jean
- 27 March 2009 – Sydney Convention and Exhibition Centre, Darling Harbour, Sydney hosted by Pete Wentz

== Award categories ==
Category	2005	2006	2007	2008	2009
Best Video/Video of the Year	Yes	Yes	Yes	Yes	Yes
Best Aussie	No	No	No	Yes	Yes
Best Kiwi	No	No	No	Yes	Yes
Breakthrough	Yes	Yes	Yes	Yes	Yes
Best Collaboration/Best Hook-Up	No	No	Yes	No	Yes
Best Rock Video	Yes	Yes	Yes	No	Yes
Best Dance Video	Yes	Yes	Yes	No	Yes
Best Moves	No	No	No	No	Yes
Free Your Mind	Yes	Yes	Yes	Yes	Yes
International Music Artist of the Year	No	No	No	Yes	No
Video Vanguard Award	No	No	Yes	No	No
Download of the Year	No	No	Yes	No	No
Album of the Year	No	Yes	Yes	No	No
Song of the Year	No	Yes	No	No	No
Best Hip-Hop Video	No	Yes	Yes	No	No
Best R&B Video	Yes	Yes	No	No	No
Best Pop Video	Yes	Yes	Yes	No	No
Best Male Artist	Yes	Yes	Yes	No	No
Best Female Artist	Yes	Yes	Yes	No	No
Best Group	Yes	Yes	Yes	No	No
Best Dressed Video	Yes	No	No	No	No
Sexiest Video	Yes	No	Yes	No	No
Movie Star Award	No	No	No	Yes	No
Sport's Award	No	No	No	Yes	No
Supernova Award	Yes	No	No	No	No
VH1 Music First Award	Yes	No	No	No	No
Viewer's Choice (Australia & New Zealand)	Yes	Yes	Yes	No	No
Television Moment Award	No	No	No	Yes	No
Good Karma Award	No	No	No	Yes	No
Bad Karma Award	No	No	No	Yes	No
Live Performer Award	No	No	No	Yes	No
Remake Award	No	No	No	Yes	No
Spankin' New Aussie Artist Award	No	Yes	No	No	No

== Award winners ==
=== 2005 ===
- Best Male Artist: Shannon Noll
- Best Female Artist: Delta Goodrem
- Breakthrough Artist: Missy Higgins
- Best Group: Green Day
- Best Dance Video: Usher – Yeah!
- Best Pop Video: Guy Sebastian – Out with My Baby
- Best Rock Video: Green Day – American Idiot
- Best R&B Video: The Black Eyed Peas – Hey Mama
- Sexiest Video: The Black Eyed Peas – Hey Mama
- Best Dressed Video: Gwen Stefani – What You Waiting For?
- Video of the Year: The Dissociatives – Somewhere Down the Barrel
- Pepsi Viewers Choice: Delta Goodrem
- Supernova: Evermore
- VH1 Music First: Cher
- Free Your Mind: AusAID

=== 2006 ===
- Best Male Artist – Shannon Noll
- Best Female Artist – Ashlee Simpson
- Spankin' New Aussie Artist – The Veronicas
- Best Group – Green Day
- Best Dance Video – Rogue Traders – Voodoo Child
- Best Pop Video – Ashlee Simpson – Boyfriend
- Best Rock Video – The Darkness – One Way Ticket
- Best R&B Video – Chris Brown – Run It!
- Best Hip-Hop Video – Snoop Dogg – Drop It Like It's Hot
- Album of the Year – Bernard Fanning – Tea and Sympathy
- Song of the Year – James Blunt – You're Beautiful
- Video of the Year – The Veronicas – 4ever
- Viewers Choice – Anthony Callea
- Free Your Mind Award – Peter Garrett

=== 2007 ===
- Spankin' New Artist – Teddy Geiger – For You I Will (Confidence)
- Sexiest Video – Fergie – Fergalicious
- Best Pop Video – Guy Sebastian – Elevator Love
- Best Rock Video – Thirty Seconds to Mars – The Kill
- Best Male Artist – Shannon Noll – Lonely
- Best Female Artist – Pink – U + Ur Hand
- Best Group – Red Hot Chili Peppers
- Album of the Year – Evanescence – The Open Door
- Best Hip Hop Video – Snoop Dogg ft. R. Kelly – That's That
- Video of the Year – Thirty Seconds to Mars – The Kill
- Download of the Year – Pink – Who Knew
- Best Dance Video – Fedde le Grand – Put Your Hands Up 4 Detroit
- Best Hook Up – Justin Timberlake featuring Timbaland – SexyBack
- Viewers Choice Australia – Good Charlotte
- Viewers Choice New Zealand – Goodnight Nurse

=== 2008 ===
- Music Video of the Year – Delta Goodrem – Believe Again
- Australian Artist Music Award – The Veronicas
- New Zealand Artist Music Award – Scribe
- MTV Live Performer Award – Pink – I'm Not Dead Tour
- Television Moment Award – The Chaser's War on Everything – "APEC 2007 Stunt"
- MTV Good Karma Award – Earth Hour – Engaging Australia and the world to act against climate change
- MTV Bad Karma Award – Kevin Andrews – For all of the above, especially the hair, and the Snoop Dogg thing
- Remake Award – Summer Heights High – Ja'mie's teary tirade
- Movie Star Award – Matt Damon
- Sport's Award – Mick Fanning
- International Music Artist of the Year – Timbaland

=== 2009 ===
- Best Collaboration – T.I. Feat. Rihanna – Live Your Life
- Best Rock Video – Fall Out Boy – I Don't Care
- Best Dance Video – The Ian Carey Project – Get Shaky
- Best Moves – Britney Spears – Circus
- Best Aussie – Jessica Mauboy
- Best Breakthrough – Katy Perry
- Best Kiwi – Nesian Mystik
- Independent Spirit – Sneaky Sound System
- Best Video – Pink – So What

== Memorable moments ==
=== 2007 ===
- Award host and performer Snoop Dogg was denied entry into Australia.

=== 2006 ===
- Russell Crowe dropped his mic.
- Snoop Dogg was late to announce the Video of the Year.

=== 2005 ===
- Anna Nicole Smith bares her breasts when presenting the Video of the Year Award with Kelly Slater.
- Carmen Electra performs a strip tease for the audience.
- All the sound shut down during The Dissociatives performance.

== Award themes ==
In 2005, There was a circus theme to go with the location at Luna Park Sydney. At the show they had a circus tent set up and when awards were given, clowns were shown doing things that related to the award (e.g. Best Group had clowns holding a net ready to catch the other clown jumping from a high place).

The theme for 2006 was the budgie smuggler. During the lead up to the show MTV Australia aired adverts where men would talk about their budgie smugglers and how they like to wear them and so on. The logo for the show however did not reflect this theme.

In 2007, the TV advertising campaign for the 2007 awards featured various singers and groups unrolling their own red carpets in different locations around Australia. This year MTV Advert was about the focus on the Technology park with people with white costumes with a white helmet with cords and plugs on the helmet it was shot at the technology park where the event is going to be taken place.

== See also ==
- List of MTV award shows
- MTV Australia
- Recipients of the MTV AVMA's New Zealand Choice Award
