= TRL Australia =

- Also known as: TRL
- Directed by: Craig Tinetti (2004); Jakub Jacko (2005-2006, 2019)
- Starring: Maz Compton; Jason Dundas; Lyndsey Rodrigues; Nathan Sapsford; Ash London; Angus O'Loughlin; Flex Mami; Lisa Hamilton
- Country of origin: Australia

Production
- Running time: 60 minutes

Original release
- Network: MTV Australia
- Release: 2004 – 2006
- Release: 8 March 2019 – present

Total Request Live (known commonly as TRL) is an Australian television program based on the American program of the same name broadcast on MTV that features popular music. It premiered in early April 2004 as a weekend show produced on a large cruising vessel known as The Pontoon, dubbed the "MTV Cruiser" which floated around Sydney Harbour containing the audience, performing bands and VJs. Australian band Killing Heidi were the first to perform on the show. After the summer months TRL Australia was broadcast from various venues around Sydney (including Home Nightclub and Coogee Beach Palace) before moving into a studio with a live audience. The show was originally hosted by Kyle Sandilands, Maz Compton and Jason Dundas and simulcast on 2Day FM. Kyle withdrew from hosting duties during 2005, leaving the hosting of TRL Australia to Maz Compton, Lyndsey Rodrigues, Nathan Sapsford and Jason Robert Dundas.

The show was largely Directed by Craig Tinetti in 2004 then Jakub Jacko in 2005, 2006 & 2019. Production of TRL Australia ceased during 2006 without any announcement. Other locally produced shows such as Full Tank and The Lair replaced TRL.

On 27 August 2018, MTV Australia announced that TRL would be making a return in 2019. Radio hosts Ash London and Angus O'Loughlin, along with DJ Flex Mami and MTV editor Lisa Hamilton were announced as the revival's presenters on 4 February 2019. The first episode was broadcast on 8 March 2019.

== See also ==
- List of Australian music television shows
- MTV Australia
- MTV Australia Video Music Awards
- MuchMusic
- Total Request Live
- TRL Italy
- TRL Poland
