= The Secret Life Of... (album) =

2005 studio album by the Veronicas

The Secret Life of...

Studio album by The Veronicas
- Released: 17 October 2005
- Recorded: 2005
- Genres: Pop rock; pop punk
- Length: 42:32
- Labels: Sire; London
- Producers: Billy Steinberg; Greg Wells; Raine Maida; Chantal Kreviazuk; Max Martin; Rami Yacoub; Lukasz Gottwald; Toby Gad; Don Gilmore; Josh Alexander

The Veronicas chronology
The Secret Life of... (2005)	Hook Me Up (2007)

Singles from The Secret Life of...
- 1. "4ever" Released: 15 August 2005; 2. "Everything I'm Not" Released: 21 November 2005; 3. "When It All Falls Apart" Released: 20 March 2006; 4. "Revolution" Released: 7 August 2006; 5. "Leave Me Alone" Released: 4 November 2006

The Secret Life of... is the debut studio album by Australian pop rock band the Veronicas, released on 17 October 2005 on Sire Records. A special limited edition DVD was released with the US version. This edition included two extra songs and videos, and was only available online. It reached number 2 in Australia and is certified 4× platinum. The album spent over a year in the ARIA Albums Chart, without leaving the top 40. The album also reached number 5 in New Zealand and number 3 in the Billboard Top Heatseekers. The Secret Life of... has sold around 50,000 copies in the USA. In early 2007, the album was released worldwide to countries in Asia and in the UK. Positive reception of singles has already been successful in parts of Europe and Asia.

The first single to be released off the album, "4ever", received much radio play in Australia and America. It reached number 2 on the ARIA Singles Chart, also reaching number 20 on the U.S. Hot Dance Club Play chart and number 90 on the U.S. Billboard Pop 100. The song "Secret" is featured on Dance! Online, a multiplayer online casual rhythm game.

In September 2006, the Veronicas were nominated for 3 ARIA Awards for The Secret Life of..., including Best Pop Release, Highest Selling Album and Breakthrough Artist Album. On 29 October, at the ARIA Awards, The Secret Life of... won Best Pop Release. They lost Breakthrough Artist Album to Wolfmother and Highest Selling Album to Human Nature.

== Critical reception ==
Professional ratings
Review scores
Source	Rating
AllMusic	4.5/5 stars
Artistdirect	4.5/5 stars
Blender	3/5 stars
E! Online	3/5 stars
Rolling Stone	2/5 stars
Sputnikmusic	3.5/5 stars
Stylus	(A)
PopMatters	(4/10)
Slant Magazine	2.5/5 stars
The Age	(unfavorable)

The album received generally positive reviews. Stephen Thomas Erlewine from AllMusic stated "[...] it's a terrific little pop record [...] an unexpected gift, a slick, tuneful set of pure sugarcoated fun. Here, melody runs through both the verses and choruses, the hooks dig deeper, not just on the tracks helmed by Martin, but on the Orgliasso sisters' songs, too." Laura Sinagra from Blender complimented their songs "4ever", which she said sounded like "[...] a remix of Kelly Clarkson's "Since U Been Gone" [...]" and "When It All Falls Apart" which has "[...] the marching, singalong wistfulness of great late-'80s arena pop." But she called the ballads "[...] copious [and] dull[...]" but complimented their cover of Tracy Bonham's hit Mother Mother. E! Online gave the album a C grade complementing "4ever" as "[...] an endearing pop take on the Donnas' slutty garage rock." But then said the album "[...] feels like it was designed by committee, with each track sounding like a second generation Xerox of the token girlie rocker hit on the last five Now! compilations[...]" Christian Hoard from Rolling Stone said that "4ever" was the only exceptional song on the album while the rest of it "[...] is overrun with bland, airbrushed introspection like "Mother Mother" and "Nobody Wins." Slant Magazine called the album "[...] so damned slick and irresistible[...] There's a punky sassiness to most of the album[...]" Dan Raper of PopMatters compared their style of music to those of Avril Lavigne, Katy Perry and Kelly Clarkson. He complimented their songs "Revolution", "Leave Me Alone", "Mouth Shut" and "Heavily Broken" stating that "[...]half the songs on the record fall into this mould of attractively packaged, unremarkable pop." Craig Mathieson of The Age gave positive reviews for "4ever" and "Revolution" but criticised the rest of the album. The New York Times said the album had "Sugar-sharp songs with a hint of intrigue[...]", and Entertainment Weekly also complimented them stating "Guilty pleasure or not, these girls won't be a Secret for long."

== Chart performance ==
In Australia, The Secret Life of... made its debut at number seven on the ARIA Top 50 Albums Chart on the issue dated 30 October 2005. After dropping and rising on the charts for up to six months the album eventually went on to peak at number two where it stayed for two weeks. By the end of 2005 the album was certified platinum and by 2006 it was made a further four times platinum with a shipment of 280,000 copies. In New Zealand, the album made its debut and peaked at number five in 2006. The album was certified gold by the Recording Industry Association of New Zealand for shipments of 7,500 copies.

It made its debut and peaked at number one hundred and thirty-three in the U.S. on the Billboard 200 chart. It spent only two weeks on the chart with sales of 14,556 copies. It also peaked at number three on the Billboard Top Heatseekers chart where it spent ten weeks.

In Europe, the album peaked at number eleven on the Ultratop 50 albums chart in Belgium. The album spent a total of nineteen non-consecutive weeks on the chart. In the rest of Europe it peaked at number seventy-five on the Dutch MegaCharts and at number sixty-one on the Switzerland album charts.

== Singles ==
"4ever" was released as the album's lead single on 15 August 2005. The single was successful in Australia peaking at number two and peaking at number seven in New Zealand. In Europe it became a top 40 hit in Austria, Belgium, Germany, Italy and Switzerland and in the United States it peaked at number twelve on the Bubbling Under Hot 100 Singles chart. "Everything I'm Not" was released as the second single in Australia and New Zealand. It peaked at number seven in Australia and number ten in New Zealand. It also peaked at number three on the Ultratip charts in Belgium. "When It All Falls Apart" was the third single in Australia, New Zealand and Europe and their second single in the United States. It peaked at number seven in Australia and New Zealand, becoming their third consecutive top ten hit from the album in both countries. In Belgium it peaked at number 18 and 83 on the Dutch Charts. "Revolution" was released as the fourth single from the album in Australia. It was released on 7 August 2006 and it peaked at number eighteen. "Leave Me Alone" was the final single to be released from their album. It peaked at number forty-one in Australia and was on the top-fifty chart for only two weeks.

== Promotion ==
The Veronicas made several appearances around the world to promote their album. They performed live on Dancing with the Stars, Rove Live, Sunrise and Total Request Live in Italy and Australia. On 2 October 2005 they performed 4ever live at the 2005 NRL Grand Final during the pre-match show. They also performed live at the 2006 ARIA Music Awards, the 2006 MTV Australia Video Music Awards and the 2006 Belgium TMF Awards.

The Veronicas also sung the theme song for The WB TV series "Related" where their songs were regularly featured as well making an appearance in the episode "Daddy's Little Girl" where they performed "Heavily Broken". They also appeared in an episode of the ABC Family series Beautiful People entitled "Where are We Now?" where they performed "Revolution". Their song "4ever" was featured in the 2006 movie She's the Man, as well as being featured in an episode of The Hills, and in the third season of Laguna Beach: The Real Orange County. Their song "Nobody Wins" was also featured in an episode of The Hills.

The album received further promotion when they embarked on their first US tour which went from 28 January 2006 to 3 March 2006. They then embarked on their first Australian tour in April 2006 where all their shows were sold out. And finally in August 2006 they embarked on the "Revolution Tour" in Australia which marked one year since the release of "4ever". They also supported Ryan Cabrera on a tour of the US and were also meant to tour with Ashlee Simpson during her 2006 U.S. summer tour but had to pull out after Lisa became ill with throat nodules and needed surgery.

== Track listing ==
The Secret Life Of... track listing
No.	Title	Writer(s)	Producer(s)	Length
1.	"4ever"	Max Martin; Lukasz "Dr. Luke" Gottwald	Martin; Gottwald	3:30
2.	"Everything I'm Not"	Martin; Rami Yacoub; Gottwald; Jessica Origliasso; Lisa Origliasso	Martin; Yacoub; Gottwald	3:24
3.	"When It All Falls Apart"	Josh Alexander; Billy Steinberg; J. Origliasso; L. Origliasso	Alexander; Steinberg	3:15
4.	"Revolution"	Raine Maida; Chantal Kreviazuk	Maida; Kreviazuk	3:07
5.	"Secret"	Toby Gad; J. Origliasso; L. Origliasso	Gad	3:34
6.	"Mouth Shut"	Gad; J. Origliasso; L. Origliasso	Gad	3:39
7.	"Leave Me Alone"	Alexander; Steinberg; J. Origliasso; L. Origliasso	Alexander; Steinberg	3:31
8.	"Speechless"	Gad; J. Origliasso; L. Origliasso; S. Dally; J. Forthsyth	Gad	3:58
9.	"Heavily Broken"	Eric Nova; J. Origliasso; L. Origliasso	Clif Magness	4:17
10.	"I Could Get Used to This"	Alexander; Steinberg; J. Origliasso; L. Origliasso	Alexander; Steinberg	3:16
11.	"Nobody Wins"	Magness; Kara DioGuardi; J. Origliasso; L. Origliasso	Magness	3:53
12.	"Mother Mother"	Tracy Bonham	Greg Wells	3:07
Total length:				42:27

European & Brazilian bonus track Record Store Day 2025 LP bonus track
No.	Title	Writer(s)	Producer(s)	Length
13.	"A Teardrop Hitting the Ground^{[a]}"	Rick Nowels; Kelli Ali	Nowels; Stewart Price	3:13

US limited edition bonus tracks
No.	Title	Writer(s)	Producer(s)	Length
13.	"How Long"	Malcolm Pardon; Fredrik Rinman; J. Origliasso; L. Origliasso	DeadMono	3:53
14.	"Did Ya Think"	Magness; DioGuardi; J. Origliasso; L. Origliasso	Magness	2:45

US limited edition bonus DVD
No.	Title	Length
1.	"4ever" (music video)	3:28
2.	"Everything I'm Not" (music video)	3:26
3.	"Everything I'm Not" (making of)	19:47
4.	"Behind the Scenes Footage"	4:49
Total length:		31:33

Notes

- ^{^[a]}"A Teardrop Hitting the Ground" is listed simply as "Teardrop" on digital platforms.

== Personnel ==
- Josh Alexander – production, recording, synthesizers, keyboards, acoustic guitars, drum programming, electric guitar
- Randy Cooke – drums
- Toby Gad – production, mixing, recording, guitar, keyboard, programming
- Jens Gad – drums
- Brian "Big Boss" Gardner – mixing
- Serban Ghenea – mixing
- Don Gilmore – production, mixing
- Dr. Luke – production, instruments
- John Hanes – engineering
- Rob Jacobs – recording
- Chantal Kreviazuk – production, arrangement, keyboards
- Abe Laboriel Jr – drums
- Jason Lader – engineering
- Clif Magness – production, engineering, mixing, acoustic & electric guitar, piano, keyboards, bass guitar and programming
- Raine Maida – production, engineering, arrangement, digital editing, guitar, bass, keyboards, programming
- Max Martin – production, instruments
- Kieron Menzies – additional recording
- Dead Mono – production, mixing
- Jessica Origliasso – lead vocals, background vocals, writer, main artist
- Lisa Origiliasso – lead vocals, background vocals, writer, main artist
- Tim Pierce – electric guitar
- Chris Reynolds – engineer
- Andrew Southam – photography
- Billy Steinberg – production
- Mark "Spike" Stent – mixing
- Greg Wells – production, drums, guitar, bass, piano
- Steven Wolf – drums
- Rami Yacoub – production, instruments
- Joe Zook – recording, mixing

== Charts ==
=== Weekly charts ===
Chart (2005–2006)	Peak position
Australian Albums Chart	2
Belgian (Flanders) Albums Chart	11
Dutch Albums Chart	75
New Zealand Albums Chart	5
Swiss Albums Chart	61
US Billboard 200	133
US Billboard Top Heatseekers	3

=== Decade-end chart ===
Chart (2000–2009)	Position
Australian Albums (ARIA)	65

== Certifications ==
Region	Certification	Certified units/sales
Australia (ARIA)	4× Platinum	280,000^{^}
New Zealand (RMNZ)	Gold	7,500^{^}
^{^} Shipments figures based on certification alone.

== Release history ==
Region	Date	Label	Format	Catalogue
Australia	17 October 2005	Sire Records	CD	9362493712
New Zealand	31 January 2006	Warner Music	CD, digital download	
United States	14 February 2006	Sire Records	CD	B000E1MY8G
United Kingdom	15 February 2006	Sire Records	CD	SIRE49913.2
Germany	17 November 2006	Warner Music	CD	B000IOM8BW
Australia	11 April 2025	Rhino	LP	
