= MTV Australia Video Music Awards 2006 =

Annual Australian music awards ceremony

2006 MTV Australia Video Music Awards
- Date: 12 April 2006
- Location: Acer Arena, Sydney
- Hosted by: Ashlee Simpson

Television/radio coverage
- Network: MTV Australia

The second annual AVMA's aired live in the Acer Arena in Sydney on 12 April 2006 on the Foxtel, Austar and Optus platforms and was hosted by Ashlee Simpson.
The 2006 show left out the VH1 Music First Award (which was awarded to Cher at the 2005 show), Best Dressed Video and Sexiest Video.

== Performers ==
- Ashlee Simpson — "Boyfriend"/"L.O.V.E"
- Bernard Fanning — "Wish You Well"
- End of Fashion — "O Yeah"
- James Blunt — "You're Beautiful"
- Lee Harding — "Anything for You"
- Rogue Traders — "Watching You"
- Savage feat. Scribe — "Swing"/"Moonshine"/"They Don't Know"
- Shannon Noll — "Shine"
- The Darkness — "One Way Ticket"/"I Believe in a Thing Called Love"
- The Veronicas — "When It All Falls Apart"

== Nominees and winners ==
The winners are in bold.

=== Video of the Year ===
- Gorillaz — "Feel Good Inc."
- Green Day — "Wake Me Up When September Ends"
- Madonna — "Hung Up"
- The Darkness — "One Way Ticket"
- **The Veronicas — "4ever"**

=== Song of the Year ===
- Ben Lee — "Catch My Disease"
- Bernard Fanning — "Wish You Well"
- **James Blunt — "You're Beautiful"**
- Kanye West — "Gold Digger"
- Madonna — "Hung Up"

=== Album of the Year ===
- Ben Lee — Awake Is the New Sleep
- **Bernard Fanning — Tea & Sympathy**
- Coldplay — X&Y
- Foo Fighters — In Your Honor
- Madonna — Confessions on a Dance Floor

=== Best Male Artist ===
- Bernard Fanning — "Wish You Well"
- James Blunt — "You're Beautiful"
- Kanye West — "Gold Digger"
- Robbie Williams — "Tripping"
- **Shannon Noll — "Shine"**

=== Best Female Artist ===
- **Ashlee Simpson — "Boyfriend"**
- Kelly Clarkson — "Because of You"
- Madonna — "Hung Up"
- Mariah Carey — "Shake It Off"
- Missy Higgins — "The Special Two"

=== Best Group ===
- Foo Fighters — "Best of You"
- Gorillaz — "Feel Good Inc."
- **Green Day — "Wake Me Up When September Ends"**
- U2 — "All Because of You"
- Wolfmother — "Mind's Eye"

=== Spankin' New Aussie Artist ===
- End of Fashion — "O Yeah"
- Kisschasy — "Do-Do's & Whoa-Oh's"
- Rogue Traders — "Voodoo Child"
- **The Veronicas — "4ever"**
- Wolfmother — "Mind's Eye"

=== Best Rock Video ===
- Foo Fighters — "Best of You"
- Green Day — "Wake Me Up When September Ends"
- Pete Murray — "Class A"
- **The Darkness — "One Way Ticket"**
- Wolfmother — "Mind's Eye"

=== Best Pop Video ===
- Anthony Callea — "The Prayer"
- **Ashlee Simpson — "Boyfriend"**
- Kelly Clarkson — "Because of You"
- Robbie Williams — "Tripping"
- The Veronicas — "4ever"

=== Best Dance Video ===
- BodyRockers — "I Like The Way (You Move)"
- Madonna — "Hung Up"
- Mylo — "Drop the Pressure"
- Rihanna — "Pon de Replay"
- **Rogue Traders — "Voodoo Child"**

=== Best R&B Video ===
- Jade MacRae — "So Hot Right Now"
- **Chris Brown feat. Juelz Santana — "Run It!"**
- Mariah Carey — "Shake It Off"
- Mario — "Let Me Love You"
- Pussycat Dolls — "Don't Cha"

=== Best Hip Hop Video ===
- 50 Cent — "Candy Shop"
- The Black Eyed Peas — "Don't Phunk with My Heart"
- Kanye West feat. Jamie Foxx — "Gold Digger"
- Savage feat. Akon — "Moonshine"
- **Snoop Dogg feat. Pharrell — "Drop It Like It's Hot"**

=== Viewers Choice ===
- **Anthony Callea — "The Prayer"**
- The Veronicas — "4ever"

=== Free Your Mind Award ===
- **Peter Garrett**

== See also ==
- MTV Australia
- MTV Australia Video Music Awards
