= Hook Me Up (The Veronicas song) =

2007 single by the Veronicas

- CD single cover

Single by the Veronicas

from the album Hook Me Up
- B-side: "Everything"; "Insomnia"
- Released: 18 August 2007
- Genre: Electropop; dance-pop
- Length: 2:56
- Label: Sire
- Songwriters: Shelly Peiken; Greg Wells; Jessica Origliasso; Lisa Origliasso
- Producer: Greg Wells

The Veronicas singles chronology
"Leave Me Alone" (2006)	"Hook Me Up" (2007)	"Untouched" (2007)

"Hook Me Up" is a song by Australian musical duo the Veronicas for their second album of the same name (2007). Produced by Greg Wells and Engineered by Drew Pearson, it was released as the album's lead single on 18 August 2007 as a digital download. The down-tempo, electropop-dance song, is a change in direction from the pop rock sound from their previous album, The Secret Life Of... (2005). It was written by the Veronicas' twin sisters, Jessica Origliasso and Lisa Origliasso, together with Shelly Peiken and Wells. The central theme of "Hook Me Up" is about escaping reality and the stresses of life.

The recording was well received by critics who praised the song for its "dance-floor friendly" sound. It was commercially successful, peaking at number one on the Australian ARIA Singles Charts, giving the Veronicas their first number-one single. The accompanying music video portrays Jessica and Lisa in a boarding school rebellion. "Hook Me Up" was performed at the 2008 Australia Day Live Concert as well as on the Hook Me Up and Revenge Is Sweeter tours, in 2007 and 2009, respectively. At the ARIA Music Awards of 2008, it was nominated for highest-selling single.

== Background and composition ==
"Hook Me Up"
"Hook Me Up" has '80s-influenced electronic synths and a techno beat made by a synthesiser keyboard, synthesised drums, and guitars.

"Hook Me Up" was written by the Veronicas' twin sisters, Jessica and Lisa Origliasso together with Shelly Peiken and Greg Wells – Wells also produced the track. The composition was influenced by the electropop of underground bands in Los Angeles, whose sound the Veronicas were keen to incorporate into their own music. Jessica explained the lyrical content and central theme behind "Hook Me Up": "It's about being tired with where you're at in life and wanting to get away and out for just a little bit of time-whether it's in a relationship or in life. I guess we went through that a little bit when things started getting full on with us. It went from one extreme, where no one knew who we were, to the complete opposite".

"Hook Me Up" is a down-tempo electropop-dance song that is set in common time. It is written in the key of G minor and moves at a moderate 134 beats per minute. "Hook Me Up" begins with electronic synths and electronic pop beats, then progresses into a down-tempo techno beat with synth washes played by guitars, synthesiser keyboards, and synthesised drums. "Hook Me Up" samples elements of "Tainted Love" by Soft Cell.

== Reception ==
Ben Norman from About.com called "Hook Me Up" "quite fun" with a "serious drive to the dance floor". Similarly, Alex Lai from Contactmusic.com commented on the "sexy" and "sassy" track, saying that it, and the album's fourth single "Take Me on the Floor", "could fill dance floors", but he noted that the latter made for "stale listening". David James Young, from Sputnikmusic, felt it was the best song on the album, "the best thing about this song is how damn infectious it is, thus making it an excellent pop song with top harmonies and a synth hook". Andrew Tijs from CitySearch Brisbane stated that it "has the kind of breathless, carnivorous sexuality that Madonna still keeps trying to convince us she has", but it wasn't "the sexual awakening that most have been waiting for [them] to have". For its lyrics, Evan Sawdey from PopMatters said "Hook Me Up" "sacrifice[s] lyrical clarity for the sake of a good hook".

In Australia, "Hook Me Up" debuted at number five on the ARIA Singles Chart. It spent seven weeks on the charts before reaching number one on 18 November, where it stayed for one week and became their first ever number-one single. It was certified platinum by the Australian Recording Industry Association (ARIA), denoting 70,000 copies shipped in Australia. Upon its release it became the second most added track on Australian radio. On the ARIA end of year charts "Hook Me Up" ranked number twenty two. "Hook Me Up" was nominated for "Highest Selling Single" at the ARIA Music Awards of 2008.

== Music video ==
=== Background ===
The Veronicas pushed for a school revolt storyline to the music video's director Scott Speer, after a concept which would "sex up [Lisa and Jessica]" was first presented to them. The Veronicas explained the concept of the music video to the Herald Sun:

We explained to him what the song was about and he said, "So, breaking out ... what about a boarding school?" We love any movies to do with boarding schools – Cruel Intentions, The Craft. We were like "Yes, yes!" and we all brainstormed from there [...] We really had to push. A lot [...] We had a lot of control over making the music on this record and we wrote "Hook Me Up" so we would have the best idea of what the video would be. So it was "Use our ideas. They're free" [...] Because the song is so different from the first record, we wanted to make a video that was young and fun that kids could relate to. The video idea that was first proposed really was not for a young market. It was a lot older.

=== Synopsis ===
The music video is based on a boarding school revolt. The video starts off with flash images of the exterior of an old school building. It then cuts to two separate lines of male and female students, the latter being led by Lisa and Jessica, marching down a school corridor. They were led by a teacher with a whip in her hand while being watched on surveillance cameras. The scene then shifts to the male students walking past a sign that says "no girls beyond this point". The first verse then begins and the students are marching into a classroom and sit at individual tables. When the chorus begins, Lisa and Jessica are standing on a stage in front of their band performing for rows of still students who stare back blankly. When the second verse begins the students are in the classroom while guards patrol its perimeter and the teacher hits a blackboard with a pointing stick. During the second chorus Lisa and Jessica get their band members together in a toilet to start their rebellion at the school. When the bridge starts smash cuts are shown of them taking over the school's PA system, and the students getting up from their chairs in the classrooms and throwing objects at a teacher standing in front of a blackboard. The video ends with everyone running down stairs out of the school, with Jessica and Lisa leading the way. The scenes are inter cut to scenes of Lisa and Jessica holding each other. They are dressed in tartan skirts with the former wearing a black cardigan and an open collared shirt, and the latter a black blazer and a shirt with a tartan patterned skinny tie. Both the cardigan and blazer have a striped crest with a pink "V" in the middle.

== Live performances ==
One of the first live performances of "Hook Me Up" was at the ARIA Music Awards of 2007, held on 21 October. Clothed in costumes similar to the music video, Lisa and Jessica appeared from a yellow school bus. During the performance Lisa and Jessica sang vocals, while the latter also played the electric guitar, with their band, as opposed to using synthesised instruments in the original recording. At the end of the performance, two streamer cannons on opposite ends of the stage, shot out pink streamers. The duo promoted the track on Australian television, including Today and Rove Live. They also performed the song at the 2008 Australia Day Live Concert in Canberra, Australia's Funniest Home Videos, Take 40 Live Lounge, and on Video Hits in 2009. "Hook Me Up" was added to the set lists of both the Hook Me Up and Revenge Is Sweeter tours in 2007 and 2009, respectively.

== Track listing ==
iTunes single

1. "Hook Me Up" – 2:57

CD single

1. "Hook Me Up" – 2:57
2. "Everything" – 3:20
3. "Insomnia" – 3:28

== Personnel ==
- Songwriting – Jessica Origliasso, Lisa Origliasso, Shelly Peiken, Greg Wells
- Production – Greg Wells
- Instruments and programming – Greg Wells, Fabien Waltmann, Sven Martin
- Recording – Drew Pearson
- Engineering – Josh Alexander
- Lead and background vocals – Jessica Origliasso, Lisa Origliasso
- Mixing – Greg Wells

== Charts ==
=== Weekly charts ===
Weekly chart performance for "Hook Me Up"
Chart (2007–2009)	Peak position
Australia (ARIA)	1
Mexico (Billboard Ingles Airplay)	2

=== Year-end charts ===
Year-end chart performance for "Hook Me Up"
Chart (2007)	Position
Australia (ARIA)	22

== Certifications ==
Certifications for "Hook Me Up"
Region	Certification	Certified units/sales
Australia (ARIA)	Platinum	70,000^{^}
United States (RIAA)	Gold	500,000^{‡}
^{^} Shipments figures based on certification alone.^{‡} Sales+streaming figures based on certification alone.

== Release history ==
Release dates and formats for "Hook Me Up"
Region	Date	Format	Ref.
Australia	18 August 2007	Digital download	
Australia	27 August 2007	Mainstream airplay	
Australia	22 September 2007	CD single	

== See also ==
- List of number-one singles in Australia in 2007
