= Josh Alexander (songwriter) =

Canadian songwriter and producer

- Born: Josh Alexander
- Origin: United States
- Occupations: Songwriter; record producer

Josh Alexander is an American songwriter, producer and pianist. He is best known for his collaborations with songwriter/producer Billy Steinberg. His work includes songs for Demi Lovato ("Give Your Heart a Break"), JoJo ("Too Little Too Late"), Katharine McPhee ("Over It"), Nicole Scherzinger ("Don't Hold Your Breath"), and t.A.T.u ("All About Us").

== Biography ==
A native of San Francisco, Alexander was trained in classical piano and according to Billy Steinberg, Alexander can "play piano extremely well, like Elton John." Steinberg met Alexander through Steinberg's uncle. Alexander was the son of friends of Steinberg's uncle, and Alexander was only 19 or 20 at the time they met. Steinberg signed him to his first publishing deal at age 20.

Alexander decided early in his career to become a "complete songwriter", writing melodies, tracks, and lyrics.

== Songwriting credits ==
Year	Artist	Song	Co-written with	Notes
2005	Fefe Dobson	"Don't Let It Go to Your Head"	Billy Steinberg, Fefe Dobson	—
2005	t.A.T.u.	"All About Us"	Billy Steinberg, Lisa Origliasso, Jessica Origliasso	#8 UK Singles Chart. #6 Europe
2006	The Veronicas	"When It All Falls Apart"	Billy Steinberg, Lisa Origliasso, Jessica Origliasso	—
2006	JoJo	"Too Little Too Late"	Billy Steinberg, Ruth-Anne Cunningham	#3 US Billboard Hot 100. #2 US Mainstream Top 40 Radio
2006	JoJo	"How to Touch a Girl"	Billy Steinberg, JoJo	—
2006	The Veronicas	"Leave Me Alone"	Billy Steinberg, Lisa Origliasso, Jessica Origliasso	—
2006	Paris Hilton	"Heartbeat"	Billy Steinberg	—
2007	Katharine McPhee	"Over It"	Billy Steinberg, Ruth-Anne Cunningham	#29 US Billboard Hot 100
2007	Leona Lewis	"The Best You Never Had"	Billy Steinberg	—
2007	The Veronicas	''I Can't Stay Away''	Billy Steinberg	—
2008	Ashely Tisdale	"How Do You Love Someone?"	Billy Steinberg, Porcelain Black	—
2008	t.A.T.u.	"Fly On The Wall"	Billy Steinberg	—
2008	Taylor Dayne	"I'm Over My Head"	Billy Steinberg	—
2009	Ewa Farna	"Toužím"	Billy Steinberg, Tamar Kaprelian, Ewa Farna	Czech version of "What If"
2009	Tata Young	"Perfection"	Billy Steinberg, Ruth-Anne Cunningham, Leona Lewis	—
2010	Charice	"In Love So Deep"	Billy Steinberg, The Corrs, Rick Nowels	—
2010	Ewa Farna	"EWAkuacja"	Billy Steinberg, Tamar Kaprelian, Mirosława Szawińska	Polish version of "What If"
2010	Jessica Mauboy	"What Happened to Us"	Billy Steinberg, Jeremy Skaller, Rob Larow, Jay Sean	—
2011	Nicole Scherzinger	"Don't Hold Your Breath"	Billy Steinberg, Toby Gad	#1 UK Singles Chart
2011	CeeLo Green	"Anyway"	Cee Lo Green (as Thomas Callaway), Eric Frederic, Ross Golan, Rivers Cuomo	#12 UK R&B Chart
2011	Miranda Cosgrove	"High Maintenance"	Billy Steinberg, Rivers Cuomo	—
2011	Selena Gomez & the Scene	"That's More Like It"	Billy Steinberg, Katy Perry	—
2011	Greyson Chance	"Unfriend You"	Billy Steinberg	—
2011	Demi Lovato	"Give Your Heart a Break"	Billy Steinberg	#1 US Mainstream Top 40 Radio. #16 Billboard Hot 100
2012	Bridgit Mendler	"We're Dancing"	Billy Steinberg, Bridgit Mendler	—
2013	Krewella	"Enjoy The Ride"	Billy Steinberg, Jahan Yousaf, Yasmine Yousaf, Kris Trindl	—
2014	Caleb Johnson	"Only One"	Caleb Johnson, Sam Hollander	—
2014	LP	"Salvation"	Billy Steinberg, LP	—
2014	LP	"Savannah"	Billy Steinberg, LP	—
2014	The Veronicas	"Mad Love"	Lisa Origliasso, Jessica Origliasso, Toby Gad	—
2014	The Veronicas	"Did You Miss Me"	Lisa Origliasso, Jessica Origliasso, Toby Gad, Billy Corgan	—
2014	Weezer	"Da Vinci"	Rivers Cuomo	—
2014	Weezer	"Lonely Girl"	Rivers Cuomo	—
2014	Jessie J	"Masterpiece"	Britt Burton, Emily Warren	#10 Germany, #9 Austria, #9 Switzerland
2016	Tini Stoessel	"My Stupid Heart"	Billy Steinberg	—
2016	Tini Stoessel	"Si Tu Te Vas"	Billy Steinberg	—
2017	Weezer	"Sweet Mary"	Rivers Cuomo	—
2017	Weezer	"Get Right"	Rivers Cuomo, Jonny Coffer, Johnny McDaid	—
2017	Weezer	"La Mancha Screwjob"	Rivers Cuomo	—
2019	Weezer	"High as a Kite"	Rivers Cuomo	—
