= 4ever (The Veronicas song) =

2005 single by the Veronicas

Single by the Veronicas

from the album The Secret Life Of...
- B-side: "Did Ya Think", "How Long"
- Released: 15 August 2005
- Recorded: 2005
- Genre: Pop rock
- Length: 3:30
- Label: Sire
- Songwriters: Max Martin, Lukasz Gottwald
- Producers: Max Martin, Lukasz Gottwald

The Veronicas singles chronology
"4ever" (2005)	"Everything I'm Not" (2005)

The Veronicas US singles chronology
"4ever" (2005)	"When It All Falls Apart" (2006)

The Veronicas US singles chronology
"Take Me on the Floor" (2009)	"4ever" (2009)	"Lolita" (2012)

The Veronicas UK singles chronology
"Untouched" (2009)	"4ever" (2009)	"Everything I'm Not" (2009)

Alternative covers
- Digital single cover

Alternative cover
- UK re-release cover

Alternative cover
- US re-release cover (2009)

"4ever" is a song written and produced by Max Martin and Lukasz Gottwald for the Veronicas' debut studio album, The Secret Life Of... (2005). It was released as the album's first single in Australia on 15 August 2005 as a CD single. The song reached number two on the ARIA Charts and number seven in New Zealand. In the United States, the single was promoted early in 2006 by Archie Comics through a mention in issue #167 of the group's namesake Veronica comic, which featured a guest appearance and cover picture of the Veronicas and a card containing a code that could be used to download an MP3 version of the song for free.

"4ever" was released as the Veronicas' second UK single in September 2009. The track was included on the UK version of the album Hook Me Up which was released shortly afterwards. The song debuted on the UK Singles Chart at number 197 on 28 September 2009, and moved up one hundred and eighty places to a new peak of 17 the following week. It was re-released in the US as the third single from Hook Me Up. The band re-recorded the vocals for the re-release of the single in the US and the release of the single in the UK. The new vocals are also used in the 2009 music video for the song.

== Writing and development ==
"4ever" was written and produced by Lukasz Gottwald and Max Martin. In an interview with Digital Spy, Veronicas member Lisa Origliasso described the idea behind the song:

I think it's just a really fun song. It's got a great guitar riff and the message behind it isn't anything too heavy. It's about living life for the moment, forgetting about your worries and just getting up and dancing. Plus it's a bit bratty, which we like!

The original version of the song was recorded in 2005. In 2009, they re-recorded the song to release in the UK and Ireland as their second single. In the press release Jess described the new sound of the 2009 version:

Since recording "4ever", the band has progressed, so we wanted to update the song [...] We recorded more guitars and new vocals to bring the song up to how it sounds when we perform it live.

== Critical reception ==
The song has received generally positive reviews. Craig Mathieson from The Age stated that the sisters "have the pop single of the year in '4ever', a juiced-up slice of stimuli that is constructed so cannily you can't help but love its deviousness." Shannon Sanders from Iowa State Daily said the song was "ever-so-clever" while Alex Macpherson from The Guardian called it a "thrilling a piece of power pop... Propelled by a crunchy guitar riff and a twitchy us-against-the-world desperation..." Dan Raper of PopMatters said "the song has a strong girl come-on and a chorus that sounds like 'It's My Life' by Bon Jovi". Nick Levine from Digital Spy called the song "an absolute smash. To put it more precisely, it's a pop-rock stomper with a killer guitar riff, lyrics about seizing the moment and a massive chorus that actually warrants the description 'anthemic'". Selby Times compared it to their hit "Untouched", saying it "complements its dynamic rock style with the same attitude and sassiness that made summer hit 'Untouched' so popular."

In 2025, the song placed 76 on the Triple J Hottest 100 of Australian Songs.

== Chart performance ==
"4ever" was first released in Australia on 15 August 2005, and made its debut on the ARIA Top 50 Singles chart at number five on 28 August. It remained in the top ten for eleven consecutive weeks where it peaked at number two on its tenth week on the chart. The song was certified platinum status by the Australian Recording Industry Association with shipments of over 75,000 copies. In New Zealand, the single made its debut on the New Zealand Singles chart at number seven where it peaked. The single spent seven non-consecutive weeks in the top ten and twenty-three weeks on the chart.

In the United States, the single made its debut on the Hot Dance Club Play charts peaking at number 20 on 17 December 2005. It also peaked at number 88 on the Pop 100 chart. In 2006, the song peaked at number twelve on the Bubbling Under Hot 100 Singles chart where it peaked, failing to break into the Billboard Hot 100 chart.

The single had moderate success throughout Europe, reaching the top 40 in Austria, Belgium, Germany, Italy, Switzerland and the Netherlands.

In 2009, the single was re-released in the UK and Ireland as the follow-up single for "Untouched" on their second album Hook Me Up. It debuted on the UK charts at number 17 on 10 October 2009. The single was on the charts for four weeks gradually dropping to number 49. In Ireland the single debuted and peaked at number 20, also staying on the charts for only four weeks.

== Music videos ==
Three different music videos were produced for "4ever". When the single was released in 2005, two music videos were shot: one for Australian distribution, and one for distribution to the United States. Later, in 2009, a third music video was shot for distribution to the United Kingdom.

The Australian version won the award for best video of the year at the MTV Australia Video Music Awards 2006.

=== Australian version (2005) ===
The Australian version of the video was shot in Sun Valley, Los Angeles in 2005. The music video is set at night and shot around a public pool and a footpath.

=== US version (2005) ===
The US version of the "4ever" music video depicts the Veronicas in various rooms of a hotel and driving in their car on the streets. Despite being the US version, it also happened to air in Australia replacing the Australian version from late September to early October 2005.

=== UK version (2009) ===
On 1 July 2009, Jess announced on her Twitter page that they would be re-filming the music video in Los Angeles on 2 July 2009. The video was directed by photographer Kenneth Cappello whom they had met at a photo shoot for the MTV series "Styl'd". In an interview they commented about shooting the video with Cappello as,

We were very excited to do the video with Kenneth [...] We wanted to get across the energy of the song with exciting visuals and grittier stylized effects.

On 11 August 2009, the new music video was released. The video involves the girls performing with a band at a wild house party while wrecking the house. The video also uses an updated version of the song with new vocals and new instruments.

== Live performances ==
The song has been performed on many television shows including Sunrise, Today, Live at the Chapel, TRL in Italy and Australia, CD:USA and a live performance at the 2005 NRL Grand Final. They have also performed live recordings of the song including Sessions@AOL, which resulted in the release of the "Sessions@AOL" EP; MTV.com Live, which they also released an ep for and included a new track called "Stay"; and in 2009, they performed a session for BBC Radio 1's Live Lounge.

== Track listings ==
CD single

1. "4ever" – 3:30
2. "How Long" – 3:52
3. "Did Ya Think" – 2:45

Digital download EP (20 December 2005)

1. "4ever" (Claude Le Gache extended edit) – 4:54
2. "4ever" (Morel's Pink Noise edit) – 4:57
3. "4ever" (E Smoove club edit) – 4:57
4. "4ever" (Lex PCH club edit) – 4:53
5. "4ever" (Mac Quayle Break edit) – 4:55

2009 digital download EP

1. "4ever" – 3:29
2. "4ever" (Jason Nevins remix) – 7:27
3. "4ever" (Cicada remix) – 6:12

== Charts ==
=== Weekly charts ===
Chart (2005–2006)	Peak position
Australia (ARIA)	2
Austria (Ö3 Austria Top 40)	23
Belgium (Ultratop 50 Flanders)	26
Germany (GfK)	29
Italy (FIMI)	42
Netherlands (Dutch Top 40 Tipparade)	20
Netherlands (Single Top 100)	83
New Zealand (Recorded Music NZ)	7
Switzerland (Schweizer Hitparade)	26
US Bubbling Under Hot 100 (Billboard)	12
US Dance Club Songs (Billboard)	20
US Pop 100 (Billboard)	88

Chart (2009)	Peak position
Ireland (IRMA)	20
Netherlands (Dutch Top 40)	21
Scottish Singles Sales (Official Charts)	7
UK Singles (Official Charts)	17

=== Year-end charts ===
Chart (2005)	Position
Australia (ARIA)	15
New Zealand (RIANZ)	47

== Certifications ==
Region	Certification	Certified units/sales
Australia (ARIA)	Platinum	70,000^{^}
New Zealand (RMNZ)	Platinum	30,000^{‡}
United States (RIAA)	Gold	500,000^{*}
^{*} Sales figures based on certification alone.^{^} Shipments figures based on certification alone.^{‡} Sales+streaming figures based on certification alone.

== Release history ==
Region	Date	Format(s)	Label	Ref.
Australia	15 August 2005	CD	Sire	
United States	30 August 2005	Airplay	Sire	
United Kingdom	28 September 2009	Digital download; CD single	Sire	
United States (2009 version)	26 October 2009	Airplay	Warner Bros.	
United States (2009 version)	3 November 2009	Digital download	Warner Bros.	

== Appearances in other media ==
"4ever" is featured in the Amanda Bynes comedy film She's the Man, during both the film itself and its advertisements, and is included in the official soundtrack. It was also featured on the first episode of the third season of the MTV series Laguna Beach: The Real Orange County, and in the final episode of the first season of The Hills. The song was released as a promo for the 2008 Ashley Tisdale film Picture This!. It is featured in the video game Thrillville: Off the Rails. The song was available as downloadable content for the SingStar series and was featured on the Australian version of SingStar Rocks!.
