= Everything I'm Not =

2005 single by the Veronicas

Single by the Veronicas

from the album The Secret Life of...
- Released: 21 November 2005
- Length: 3:23
- Label: Sire; EngineRoom Music
- Songwriters: Lukasz Gottwald; Max Martin; Jessica Origliasso; Lisa Origliasso; Rami
- Producers: Lukasz Gottwald; Max Martin; Rami

The Veronicas singles chronology
"4ever" (2005)	"Everything I'm Not" (2005)	"When It All Falls Apart" (2006)

Alternative covers
- Digital cover

Alternative covers
- New Zealand cover

"Everything I'm Not" is the second single released from Australian musical duo the Veronicas' debut album, The Secret Life of... (2005). It reached number seven on the ARIA Singles Charts and has been certified gold for shipping over 35,000 units in Australia.

== Critical reception ==
Kelefa Sanneh from The New York Times named it amongst some of the excellent songs on the album, calling it "[...] loud [and] melancholy[...]". Preston Jones from Slant Magazine stated that it felt "[...] like the estrogenically inclined counterparts to the boy-toy confection that is the Click Five's Greetings From Imrie House." Ryan Dombal from Entertainment Weekly reviewed the remix version of "Everything I'm Not", stating that the track might finally break them into the US mainstream.

== Release and chart performance ==
"Everything I'm Not" was released in Australia on 21 November 2005. The song made its debut on the chart on issue date 4 December 2005 at number 13. After a steady climb up the charts for eight weeks, the song peaked at number seven on 22 January 2006, where it stayed for one week before making its descent. It managed to spend eight weeks in the top ten, and was present on the chart for 22 non-consecutive weeks. The single was certified gold with shipments of over 35,500 copies. In New Zealand, the single made its chart debut at number 10 and remained on the chart for nine weeks, its last position at number 21. In Europe, "Everything I'm Not" peaked at number 14 on Flanders' Ultratip chart at number three.

== Live performances ==
The Veronicas performed "Everything I'm Not" on television shows such as Dancing With the Stars, The Panel, Sunrise, Live at the Chapel and the 2006 ARIA Music Awards. They also performed live recordings of the song on Sessions@AOL and in 2009 they performed the song on UK radio station Capital FM to promote the single's release. On 10 September 2009, they performed the song live at the Oxford Art Factory on Oxford Street in Paddington, Sydney as part of the MasterCard's Priceless Music Events.

== Music video ==
The "Everything I'm Not" music video features the Veronicas singing with their band while trashing a car of an ex-boyfriend, apparently named Ryan, for cheating on Lisa by painting and smashing the car with paint buckets while the ex-boyfriend looks on from a video camera. When it is too much for the ex-boyfriend to handle, he drops his cell phone on the ground. In the end, it seems like the police catch them doing it and they slam down the camera, smashing the ex-boyfriend's chances of seeing his car for the final time.

== Track listings ==
- Australian CD single
1. "Everything I'm Not" – 3:22
2. "4ever" (Claude le Gache extended vocal) – 7:16
3. "4ever" (Mac Quayle Break Mix) – 7:17
- European CD single
1. "Everything I'm Not" – 3:22
2. "4ever" (Claude le Gache extended vocal) – 7:16
- Digital download EP
1. "Everything I'm Not" (Jason Nevins Remix edit) – 3:31
2. "Everything I'm Not" (Claude Le Gache edit) – 3:59
3. "Everything I'm Not" (Claude Le Gache Mixshow) – 6:02
- Digital download EP (DJ version)
1. "Everything I'm Not" (Jason Nevins extended mix) – 6:12
2. "Everything I'm Not" (Jason Nevins Electromagnetic dub) – 6:13
3. "Everything I'm Not" (Claude Le Gache club mix) – 7:08
4. "Everything I'm Not" (Eddie Beez Mix) – 8:57
- iTunes EP
1. "Everything I'm Not" – 3:22
2. "Everything I'm Not" (Claude le Gache Mixshow) – 6:02
3. "4ever" (E Smoove club)
4. "4ever" (Claude le Gache dub)
5. "Everything I'm Not" (video)

== Charts ==
=== Weekly charts ===
Chart (2005–2006)	Peak position
Australia (ARIA)	7
Belgium (Ultratip Bubbling Under Flanders)	3
New Zealand (Recorded Music NZ)	10

=== Year-end charts ===
Chart (2006)	Position
Australia (ARIA)	48

== Sales and certifications ==
Region	Certification	Certified units/sales
Australia (ARIA)	Gold	35,000^{^}
^{^} Shipments figures based on certification alone.

== Release history ==
Region	Date	Format	Label	Ref.
Australia	21 November 2005	CD single	Sire; EngineRoom Music	
United States	28 February 2006	iTunes EP	Sire; WEA International	
United States	May 2006	CD single	Sire; WEA International	
United States	13 June 2006	Digital download	Sire; WEA International	
