= Revolution (The Veronicas song) =

2006 single by the Veronicas

Single by the Veronicas

from the album The Secret Life of...
- Released: 7 August 2006
- Length: 3:06
- Label: Sire
- Songwriters: Chantal Kreviazuk; Raine Maida
- Producers: Chantal Kreviazuk; Raine Maida

The Veronicas singles chronology
"When It All Falls Apart" (2006)	"Revolution" (2006)	"Leave Me Alone" (2006)

"Revolution" is a song by Australian pop duo the Veronicas, released as the fourth single from their debut album, The Secret Life of... (2005). Written and produced by Chantal Kreviazuk and Raine Maida, the song was released on 7 August 2006 in conjunction with their 'The Revolution Tour' of Australia, which commenced on 4 August 2006. It was a modest success in Australia, peaking at number 18 on the ARIA Singles Chart. The "Revolution" video features footage from the Veronicas' Brisbane concert in August 2006 and also shows backstage footage and shots of fans in the crowd.

== Track listing ==
1. "Revolution" – 3:05
2. "When It All Falls Apart" (Lost in Space Remix) – 4:56
3. "Revolution" (live) – 3:30

== Charts ==
Weekly chart performance for "Revolution"
Chart (2006)	Peak position
Australia (ARIA)	18
