= When It All Falls Apart =

2006 single by the Veronicas

Single by the Veronicas

from the album The Secret Life of...
- B-side: "Heavily Broken" (live)
- Released: 20 March 2006
- Length: 3:14
- Label: Sire; EngineRoom Music
- Songwriters: Josh Alexander; Billy Steinberg; Jessica Origliasso; Lisa Origliasso
- Producers: Josh Alexander; Billy Steinberg

The Veronicas singles chronology
"Everything I'm Not" (2005)	"When It All Falls Apart" (2006)	"Revolution" (2006)

The Veronicas US singles chronology
"4ever" (2005)	"When It All Falls Apart" (2006)	"Untouched" (2008)

"When It All Falls Apart" is the third single released from Australian pop music duo the Veronicas' debut studio album, The Secret Life of... (2005), on 20 March 2006. "When It All Falls Apart" charted within the Australian Singles Chart top 20 for 14 weeks, peaking at number seven, and has been certified gold for sales over 35,000 units in Australia. In the United States, the song served as the duo's second single in June 2006.

== Chart performance ==
"When It All Falls Apart" peaked at number seven in Australia and spent seven weeks inside the top 10. It reached the same position in New Zealand and entered the top 20 in the Flanders region of Belgium.

== Music video ==
The music video for "When It All Falls Apart" features the Veronicas waking up in their home to a party they had the night before. While cleaning, they have flashbacks of the party to show their house got trashed, having a crocodile going around the house. At the end of their video, they sit outside and sing the rest of their song.

== Track listing ==
1. "When It All Falls Apart" – 3:15
2. "Heavily Broken" (live) – 4:23
3. "Everything I'm Not" (Jason Nevins remix edit) – 3:30

== Charts ==
=== Weekly charts ===
Chart (2006)	Peak position
Australia (ARIA)	7
Belgium (Ultratop 50 Flanders)	19
Belgium (Ultratip Bubbling Under Wallonia)	14
Netherlands (Single Top 100)	83
New Zealand (Recorded Music NZ)	7

=== Year-end charts ===
Chart (2006)	Position
Australia (ARIA)	42

== Certifications ==
Region	Certification	Certified units/sales
Australia (ARIA)	Gold	35,000^{^}
^{^} Shipments figures based on certification alone.

== Release history ==
Region	Date	Format(s)	Label(s)	Ref.
Australia	20 March 2006	CD	Sire; EngineRoom Music	
United States	26 June 2006	Hot adult contemporary radio	Warner Bros.	
United States	27 June 2006	Contemporary hit radio	Warner Bros.	
