= Human (The Veronicas album) =

Studio album by the Veronicas
- Released: 25 June 2021
- Genres: Pop; electropop
- Length: 38:12
- Label: Sony
- Producers: James Angus; Robby De Sá; DNA; Freddy Haggstam; Ollipop; Drew Pearson; Sam Sakr; Alexander Wildwood; xSDTRK

The Veronicas chronology
Godzilla (2021)	Human (2021)	Gothic Summer (2024)

Singles from Human
- 1. "On Your Side" Released: 14 October 2016; 2. "Think of Me" Released: 29 March 2019; 3. "Biting My Tongue" Released: 3 July 2020; 4. "Life of the Party" Released: 23 April 2021; 5. "Goodbye" Released: 18 June 2021

Human is the fifth studio album by Australian duo the Veronicas. It was released on 25 June 2021, just under a month after their fourth album Godzilla, which is their first album since The Veronicas (2014).

== Background ==
Planning for the Veronicas' fourth studio album began in 2016 with the release of the single "In My Blood", which became their third Australian number-one single. The following month in an interview with Entertainment Weekly, they confirmed they had worked with Cathy Dennis, Jim Eliot and Ollipop on an "electro-fused" album due for release in November 2016, which failed to materialise.

Subsequent singles were released; "On Your Side" in 2016 and "The Only High" in 2017. The album was then meant to be released in June 2017, but was announced on 13 November 2017 that they would not release any new material until 2018.

The single "Think of Me" was released in March 2019 and was slated as the album's first single, however no further music was released in 2019 except for buzz single "Ugly" used to promote their MTV Australia reality show The Veronicas: Blood Is for Life which aired in late 2019.

Finally, in June 2020, the album's title Human was announced, along with the single "Biting My Tongue" to be released on 3 July 2020. In an interview with Marie Claire the same month, the Veronicas provided information regarding the creative process behind Human, explaining that "although we've been writing this album over a few years, the majority of it was created in a cohesive time period. It feels like a completion of something. It feels like we had all these mini-bursts through this creation. And that whatever shift needed to happen was completed by the end of this writing phase. And each record has felt like that. But our second record and this record, most predominantly for that feeling."

A fourth single with Australian rapper Allday "Life of the Party" was released on 23 April 2021 along its music video. It was directed by Ribal Hosn and features the trio portraying "lavish" outfits on the streets and at a house party, accompanied by "glitchy" VHS footage of the three performing the song.

Human was originally announced as the duo's fourth album upon the release of "Biting My Tongue", however on 26 March 2021 the single "Godzilla" was released, with an album of the same name announced for release on 28 May, with Human to follow five weeks later.

== Music and lyrics ==
Upon the announcement of the release of the two new albums, a press release was quoted by NME reported that Godzilla "will see the Veronicas assume their 'public alter egos'", while Human "promises to explore their abilities as 'vulnerable songwriters'". A pop and electropop record, it also draws inspiration from synth-pop, trap, EDM and tropical house.

== Reception ==
Bryget Chrisfield from Stack said "Alongside recurring be-kind-to-yourself reminders and a sidepiece's epiphany, Human serves saucy lyrical delights".

Sally McMullen from Music Feeds called the album "a gentler giant of honest songwriting and melancholic dance floor perfection."

Retropop Magazine. called Human a "return to form" and awarded the album four stars out of five, receiving the album more favourably to previous release Godzilla and labelling the collection 'quintessentially The Veronicas'".

Sanity called it "a polished pop affair, with vulnerable songwriting" and the album "...is strong storytelling and personal unraveling".

In a 4 star review, Keira Leonard from The Music said "The songs on Human are as addictive as they are truly fascinating. The twins have absolutely nailed it. With flawless musical partnerships, catchy hooks, and gutsy, heartfelt lyrics, it’s a recipe for a near-perfect pop album."

== Track listing ==
Human track listing
No.	Title	Writer(s)	Producer(s)	Length
1.	"Without You"	Jessica Origliasso; Lisa Origliasso; Roberto De Sá; Isabella Kearney-Nurse	De Sá	2:55
2.	"Lies" (featuring Muki)	J. Origliasso; L. Origliasso; Sam Sakr; Madeline Crabtree	Sakr	3:31
3.	"Movie Star" (featuring Fr33sol and Lavva)	J. Origliasso; L. Origliasso; David Musumeci; Anthony Egizii; Wakeel Thomas; Deja Miller	DNA	3:16
4.	"LA"	J. Origliasso; L. Origliasso; Sakr; Grace Shaw; Crabtree	Sakr	2:50
5.	"On Your Side"	J. Origliasso; L. Origliasso; Jim Eliot; Wayne Hector	Ollipop; Freddy Haggstam	2:51
6.	"Out of Time" (featuring Wrabel)	J. Origliasso; L. Origliasso; Drew Pearson; Stephen Wrabel	Pearson	3:49
7.	"Think of Me"	J. Origliasso; L. Origliasso; De Sá; Kearney-Nurse	De Sá; xSDTRK	3:04
8.	"Jealous"	J. Origliasso; L. Origliasso; De Sá; Kearney-Nurse; Crabtree	De Sá	2:46
9.	"Biting My Tongue"	J. Origliasso; L. Origliasso; Musumeci; Egizii	DNA	3:06
10.	"Goodbye"	J. Origliasso; L. Origliasso; Musumeci; Egizii; Kearney-Nurse	DNA	3:34
11.	"Life of the Party" (featuring Allday)	J. Origliasso; L. Origliasso; Alexander Wildwood; Tomas Gaynor; Kearney-Nurse; Wrabel	Wildwood; James Angus; Pearson	3:23
12.	"Human"	J. Origliasso; L. Origliasso; Musumeci; Egizii	DNA	3:07
Total length:				38:12

== Charts ==
Chart performance for Human
Chart (2021)	Peak position
Australian Albums (ARIA)	5
