= Cruel (The Veronicas song) =

Single by The Veronicas

from the album The Veronicas
- Released: 21 January 2015
- Genre: Pop rock
- Length: 3:43
- Label: Sony Music
- Songwriters: Jessica Origliasso; Lisa Origliasso; Daniel James; Leah Haywood; Rob Ellmore
- Producers: Dreamlab; Ruffian

The Veronicas singles chronology
"If You Love Someone" (2014)	"Cruel" (2015)	"Chains" (2015)

"Cruel" is a song by The Veronicas from their self-titled third studio album. It was written by The Veronicas twin sisters Jessica Origliasso and Lisa Origliasso, along with Rob Ellmore, Leah Haywood, Daniel James; production was handled by Dreamlab and Ruffian. The song was released as the third single from The Veronicas' third studio album and debuted on Australian radio on 21 January 2015.

"Cruel" was well received by critics who felt that it would be a radio hit. In Australia, "Cruel" debuted and peaked at number 53 on the Australian Singles Chart, becoming one of their lowest charting songs to date.

== Background ==
In 2013, The Veronicas members, Jessica Origliasso and Lisa Origliasso, parted ways with their then label Warner Bros. Records. This was due to the constant delays they experienced with the release of their third album (which was known as Life on Mars at the time). After signing with Sony Music Australia in 2014, the duo were given a cash advance and used it to buy back some of their songs from Warner Bros. Records. Speaking to Kathy McCabe of news.com.au they said,"we really fought for "Cruel", "Did You Miss Me", "Mad Love", "Cold" and "Born Bob Dylan", songs that we were so emotionally attached to, we couldn't let go of." By 2014, The Veronicas released "You Ruin Me", their first single since "Lolita" which came out in 2012, as the lead single off their self-titled third studio album. "You Ruin Me" debuted atop the ARIA Singles Chart, becoming their second number-one hit in Australia since "Hook Me Up" in 2007, and was certified triple platinum by the Australian Record Industry Association (ARIA). A snippet of "Cruel" first appeared in the beginning of the accompanying music video for "You Ruin Me", which was directed by Matt Sharp and Tapehead. In an interview with Stephanie Anderson of BuzzFeed, Jessica hinted at the snippet of the song (the title of which was not revealed) as being the next single. However, "If You Love Someone" was serviced as the follow-up release instead.

"Cruel" was co-written by The Veronicas duo, along with Rob Ellmore, Leah Haywood (of production team Dreamlab) and Daniel James, with Dreamlab producing the track. Discussing the recording with BuzzFeed, Jessica described the track as, "sort of like the inner workings of our mind and it encompasses everything that a Veronicas song is, which is like, the sound is very upbeat song, but the lyrics are a little bit bitter."

== Release and reception ==
The Veronicas teased the release of "Cruel" on Twitter while on set in Los Angeles. In the tweet they quoted the line "a little twist of the knife" from the bridge of the track. In Australia, the recording was serviced to contemporary hit radio stations on 21 January 2015.

Cameron Adams of the Herald Sun praised the track saying it, "screams summer radio hit, complete with Police-style reggae stabs and an F-bomb for impact." Likewise, Noel Mengel of The Courier-Mail called it "a hit single in waiting." auspOp named the song as one of the highlights of The Veronicas along with "Cold" and "You Ruin Me". Renowned for Sound's Marcus Floyd gave "Cruel" four out of five stars. He wrote that it "should be a decent radio hit for 2015, it sells itself really with its seemingly endless supply of energy and its relatable lyrics..." "Cruel" debuted and peaked on the Australian ARIA Singles Chart at number 53 on 14 February 2015, becoming their lowest charting song on the ARIA Charts since "Popular" which failed to chart altogether.

== Promotion ==
=== Music video ===
The music video for "Cruel" was shot on a film set in the Mojave Desert in Los Angeles. Filming commenced on 19 January 2015 and concluded on 23 January. The video was uploaded to YouTube on 28 February 2015.

=== Live performances ===
On 30 October, The Veronicas performed "Cruel" live for the first time on Today Network's World Famous Rooftop. On television, the duo performed the track on Australian breakfast television programme Sunrise. "Cruel" received further promotion when they included the track on the set list for their Sanctified Tour in Australia and Europe in 2015.

== Charts and certifications ==
=== Weekly charts ===
Chart (2015)	Peak position
Australia (ARIA)	53

== Release history ==
Country	Date	Format	Label	Ref(s)
Australia	21 January 2015	Contemporary hit radio	Sony Music Australia	
