= Godzilla (The Veronicas album) =

Studio album by The Veronicas
- Released: 28 May 2021
- Genres: Pop rock; electropop
- Length: 40:05
- Label: Sony Music Australia
- Producers: 1984; Bram Inscore; Daniel Heath; DNA; Evan Bogart; Jim Eliot; John Feldmann; Justin Gray; Matt Parad; Toby Gad; Travis Barker

The Veronicas chronology
| The Veronicas (2014) | Godzilla (2021) | Human (2021) |

Singles from Godzilla
- 1. "In My Blood" Released: 10 June 2016; 2. "The Only High" Released: 2 June 2017; 3. "Godzilla" Released: 26 March 2021; 4. "Sugar Daddy" Released: 21 May 2021

Godzilla is the fourth studio album by Australian duo The Veronicas. It was released on 28 May 2021, and is their first album in seven years, following The Veronicas (2014).

== Background ==
Planning for The Veronicas' fourth studio album began in 2016 with the release of the single "In My Blood", which became their third Australian number-one single. The following month in an interview with Entertainment Weekly, they confirmed they had worked with Cathy Dennis, Jim Eliot and Ollipop on an "electro-fused" album due for release in November 2016, which failed to materialise.

Subsequent singles were released; "On Your Side" in 2016 and "The Only High" in 2017. The album was then meant to be released in June 2017, but was announced on 13 November 2017 that they would not release any new material until 2018.

The single "Think of Me" was released in March 2019 and was slated as the album's first single, however no further music was released in 2019 except for buzz single "Ugly" used to promote their MTV Australia reality show The Veronicas: Blood Is for Life which aired in late 2019.

Human was originally announced as the duo's fourth album upon the release of "Biting My Tongue", however on 26 March 2021 the single "Godzilla" was released, with an album of the same name announced for release on 28 May, with Human to follow five weeks later.

== Music and lyrics ==
Upon the announcement of the release of the two new albums, a press release was quoted by NME reported that Godzilla "will see The Veronicas assume their 'public alter egos'", while Human "promises to explore their abilities as 'vulnerable songwriters'". Described primarily as a pop rock and electropop record, the album is also noted for having influences of hard rock, grunge, hip hop, punk, electronic music, dance-pop, synth-pop and pop.

== Singles ==
The album features singles "In My Blood" and "The Only High" released in 2016 and 2017. The album's title track was released on 26 March 2021, and was described as a "raw, angsty track that harks back to some of their earliest hits" by News.com.au. On 21 May, "Sugar Daddy" was released, which NME described as "edgy".

== Reception ==
Jake Cleland from Stack Magazine said "Savage guitars, curly dance anthems and schoolyard bops cover enough ground that it feels curated from dozens of ideas into a rock-solid cross-section of their best ones."

Laura English from Music Feeds said "Godzilla is 12-track effort that sees The Veronicas hone in on[sic] that sound that made us all love them in the first place. It's genre-defying, it's all the best bits of electro-pop with an emo twist. But there's also a hip hop influence to the album that works so well."

Connor Gotto from Retropop Magazine gave the album 3 out of 5, saying "Godzilla suffers from an identity crisis that's as confused as it is jarring". Gotto said the album highlights are "Stealing Cars" and "In It to Win It".

== Track listing ==
Godzilla track listing
| No. | Title | Writer(s) | Producer(s) | Length |
|---|---|---|---|---|
| 1. | "Godzilla" | Jessica Origliasso; Lisa Origliasso; Toby Gad | Gad | 3:25 |
| 2. | "Kaleidoscope" | J. Origliasso; L. Origliasso; Gad | Gad | 3:41 |
| 3. | "In My Blood" | J. Origliasso; L. Origliasso; David Musumeci; Anthony Egizii | DNA | 3:20 |
| 4. | "In It to Win It" | J. Origliasso; L. Origliasso; Gad | Gad | 2:12 |
| 5. | "High Score" | J. Origliasso; L. Origliasso; Evan Bogart; Justin Gray | Gray; Bogart | 3:12 |
| 6. | "Stealing Cars" | J. Origliasso; L. Origliasso; Jim Eliot; Wayne Hector | Eliot | 3:43 |
| 7. | "Supernatural Girl" | J. Origliasso; L. Origliasso; Bram Inscore | Inscore | 2:59 |
| 8. | "101" | J. Origliasso; L. Origliasso; Wes Jones; Mat Sherman | 1984 | 3:49 |
| 9. | "Catch Fire" | J. Origliasso; L. Origliasso; Daniel Heath | Heath | 3:48 |
| 10. | "Silent" (featuring Travis Barker) | J. Origliasso; L. Origliasso; John Feldmann; Barker | Feldmann; Barker | 2:46 |
| 11. | "The Only High" | J. Origliasso; L. Origliasso; Shelly Peiken; Seann Bowe | DNA | 3:18 |
| 12. | "Sugar Daddy" | J. Origliasso; L. Origliasso; Jones; Sherman | 1984 | 4:03 |
| Total length: | | | | 40:05 |

== Charts ==
Chart performance for Godzilla
| Chart (2021) | Peak position |
|---|---|
| Australian Albums (ARIA) | 7 |
