= If You Love Someone =

Single by The Veronicas

from the album The Veronicas
- Released: 21 November 2014
- Recorded: Sony Music Studios, Sydney
- Genre: Pop
- Length: 3:00
- Label: Sony Music
- Songwriters: Anthony Egizii; David Musumeci; Lisa Origliasso; Jessica Origliasso; Josh Katz
- Producers: DNA & Khaled Rohaim

The Veronicas singles chronology
"You Ruin Me" (2014)	"If You Love Someone" (2014)	"Cruel" (2015)

"If You Love Someone" is the second single from Australian pop duo The Veronicas' self-titled third studio album. The track was released on November 21, 2014. The track was co-written by Anthony Egizii and David Musumeci along with The Veronicas' twins Lisa Origliasso and Jessica Origliasso and Josh Katz.

== Background and recording ==
The Veronicas released "You Ruin Me" as the lead single from their self-titled third studio album in September 2014. The song came two years after their last single, "Lolita", was released via their former label, Warner Bros. Records. "You Ruin Me" became their second Australian number-one hit and was certified triple platinum. "If You Love Someone", along with "Teenage Millionaire", was written and recorded after the Origliasso twins parted ways with Warner Bros. Records and signed with Sony Music Australia. In an interview with Kathy McCabe of News.com.au, Jessica commented on this saying, "They were written when we had just signed with Sony, and because we were in such a positive space, we wrote a couple of genuinely happy songs."

== Release and reception ==
Prior to the release of the song, a promotional track from The Veronicas titled "Line of Fire" was released with media outlets suggesting that it would be the follow-up single to "You Ruin Me". However, on 5 November 2014, "If You Love Someone" debuted on Australian radio show Shazam Top 20, where it was revealed as the second single from The Veronicas.

"If You Love Someone" received mixed to positive reviews. Popjustice referred to "If You Love Someone" as "a song that is obviously quite brilliant" and awarded it eight stars out of ten. The Herald Sun's Cameron Adams named the track, along with "You Ruin Me", "the most promising thing about [The Veronicas]". Similarly, Elizabeth Rushton of The Mancunoin called the "fist pumping single" a highlight from the album. Digital Spy writer Lewis Corner awarded the track three stars out of five and commented that overall it, "rarely fails to put a spring in your step." Tim Byron of The Guardian felt that the track "reeks of a tired formula that the Origliasso sisters have clearly outgrown." The Music's James d'Apice opined that the recording lacked originality, and described the track as "watery, Pink-derived noughties power pop." In his review of the track for Fortitude Magazine, Tom Jewitt wrote that "If You Love Someone" is "a piece of music which is vastly un-identical to the rest of their repertoire. 'If You Love Someone' is lukewarm at its best, and excruciatingly tawdry at its worst," and gave it three stars out of ten.

"If You Love Someone" debuted and peaked at No. 5 in Australia, becoming The Veronicas' fifth top 5 single in Australia. It was certified platinum by the Australian Recording Industry Association for shipments exceeding 70,000 copies. In the UK, "If You Love Someone" debuted and peaked at number 98, spending one week on the UK Singles Chart.

== Live performances ==
On 30 October, The Veronicas performed "If You Love Someone" live for the first time on Today Network's World Famous Rooftop. The Veronicas performed an acoustic version of "If You Love Someone" live in the KIIS 106.5, Sydney studio on 20 November, and a month later on Nova 93.7 in Perth for Nova's Red Room. On television, the duo performed "If You Love Someone" for the first time on breakfast show Sunrise on 21 November 2014. They also performed the recording on Today on 23 December. The Veronicas also made an appearance at Westfield Southland in Melbourne, where they performed "If You Love Someone" along with "You Ruin Me".

== Track listing ==
Digital download

1. "If You Love Someone" – 3:00

== Charts and certifications ==
=== Weekly charts ===
Chart (2014)	Peak position
Australia (ARIA)	5
UK Singles (Official Charts)	98

=== Certifications ===
Region	Certification	Certified units/sales
Australia (ARIA)	Platinum	70,000^{^}
^{^} Shipments figures based on certification alone.

== Release history ==
Country	Date	Format	Label
Australia	21 November 2014	Digital download	Sony Music Australia
United Kingdom	1 March 2015	Contemporary hit radio	RCA Records

== See also ==
- Ghost (Ella Henderson song) (2014), with the same chord scheme and similar instruments and nearly the same melody.
