= Logan Huffman =

American actor

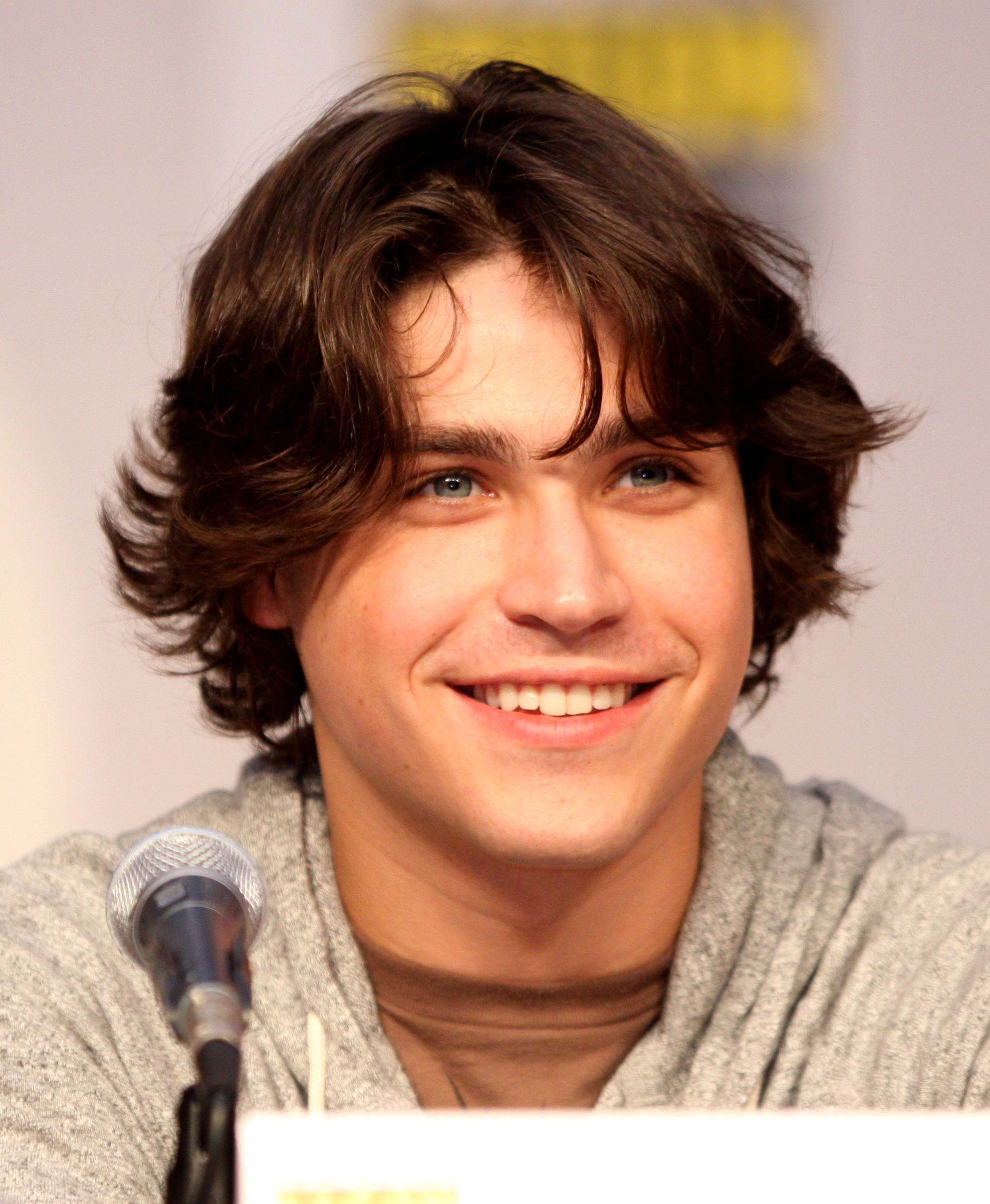
- Logan Huffman at the 2010 Comic Con in San Diego
- Born: December 22, 1989 (age 36); Noblesville, Indiana, US
- Occupation: Actor
- Years active: 2008–present
- Spouse: Lisa Origliasso (m. 2018)
- Relatives: Jessica Origliasso (sister-in-law)

Logan Huffman (born December 22, 1989) is an American actor. He appeared in the 2009 TV series V and starred in the 2013 film Bad Turn Worse.

== Personal life ==
Huffman was born in Noblesville, Indiana, where he was the first born of triplets, and has an older brother. He grew up in Indianapolis. He moved to New York City when he was 17 to pursue his dreams in acting. He is a believer in the paranormal and is dyslexic.

He became engaged to Lisa Origliasso of The Veronicas in late 2016, and married in November 2018.

== Career ==
In 2009, he joined the cast of V. His character, Tyler Evans, was not popular with fans of the series. In 2012, he appeared in Refuge, and, in 2013, he starred in Bad Turn Worse. In 2015, Huffman appeared in two films directed by Tyler Shields, Outlaw and Final Girl. He also appeared in the 2015 film The Preppie Connection.

== Filmography ==
=== Film ===
Year	Title	Role	Notes
2008	Lymelife	Blaze Salado	
2009	Circledrawers	Lewis	TV film
2009	America	Marshall	TV film
2012	A Smile as Big as the Moon	Scott	TV film
2012	Refuge	Nat	
2013	Underdogs	Bobby Burkett	
2013	Bad Turn Worse	B. J.	
2013	Complicity	Kurt O'Connor	
2015	Outlaw	Matt	
2015	The Preppie Connection	Ellis Tynes	
2015	Final Girl	Daniel	
2017	Temple	Chris	
2017	Bomb City	Ricky	
2018	Bad Stepmother	Eric	TV film
2018	Monster Party	Mickey	
2019	Straight Up (2019 film)	Darien	
2025	Chapter 51	Lawrence Hughes	

=== Television ===
Year	Title	Role	Notes
2009–2011	V	Tyler Evans	

=== Music videos ===
Year	Artist	Single	Role
2015	The Veronicas	"Cruel"	Unnamed antagonist
