= Wayne Hector =

British songwriter

- Born: Wayne Anthony Hector; London, England
- Genres: Pop; R&B
- Occupation: Songwriter

Wayne Anthony Hector is a British songwriter who is best known for his work with pop artists such as Nicki Minaj, One Direction, the Wanted, Toše Proeski, Olly Murs and JLS. He co-wrote seven of Westlife's number one singles, including "World of Our Own" and "Flying Without Wings".

He is signed to BMG Chrysalis UK.

== Career ==
Hector began his music career as a member of the new jack swing group Rhythm N Bass. The group were signed by Sony Music after entertainment executive Richard Pascoe featured the group in a European edition of Yo! MTV Raps. After this he decided to concentrate on songwriting and music production. It was this period in 1993 that Richard Pascoe took the role as International A&R manager for Pop music at Rondor Music International, where he signed Hector and fellow Rhythm N Bass member Alistair Tennant as songwriters. When transitioning from performer to songwriter, Hector got in touch with Steve Mac, who was working with the British boy band Damage. He had originally met Mac while Hector was working as a background singer.

In 1996, Damage's "Forever" became one of Hector's first songwriting credits and his first top 10 hit.

Hector contributed to Westlife's self-titled debut album in 1999. His credits on the album include "Swear It Again" and "Flying Without Wings", both of which peaked at number 1 in the United Kingdom. He also contributed "I Don't Wanna Fight", "Moments" and "We Are One" to the album. He also cowrote number 1 singles "Queen of My Heart" and "World of Our Own" on Westlife's 2001 album World of Our Own.

In 2005, Hector was signed to Sony/ATV. At the time of his signing, he had written 32 international number one singles. Later that year he worked on Rascal Flatts' "Feels Like Today", for which he won an ASCAP award. He also penned Carrie Underwood's "I Just Can't Live A Lie" in 2005.

Hector wrote "I Hate This Part" for The Pussycat Dolls in 2008. He co-wrote "Out from Under" on Britney Spears's Circus later that year. In 2009, Hector co-wrote two number one singles, "Beat Again" and "Everybody in Love", on JLS's self-titled debut album.

Hector joined Warner/Chappell Music in 2010. That year he co-wrote JLS's number one single "Love You More". He also co-wrote "Thinking of Me" on Olly Murs' 2010 self-titled debut album.

Hector wrote "Same Mistakes" and "Everything About You" for One Direction's debut album Up All Night in 2011.

In 2011, he co-wrote Nicki Minaj's "Starships" and The Wanted's "Glad You Came". He also wrote The Wanted's "I Found You", which was released in September 2012. Hector also contributed "Army of Two", "Hand on Heart" and "Personal" to Olly Murs' 2012 album Right Place Right Time.

In 2013, Hector co-wrote "Best Song Ever", "Little White Lies" and "Why Don't We Go There" for One Direction's Midnight Memories. He also wrote "Get Down" and "Supposed" on James Arthur's self-titled debut album and Mika's "Stardust". Hector worked on "Miss America", "The Only One", "Bones", "Postcard" and "Hollywood" on James Blunt's Moon Landing, which was released in October 2013. He also co-wrote "Rest of Our Life" on Jason Derulo's Tattoos.

In 2014, Hector wrote "Me and My Broken Heart" for the English pop band Rixton, "Break Your Plans" for The Fray, and "Red Lights" for Tiesto. He co-wrote "Steal My Girl" for the One Direction album Four. He also co-wrote "Changing", the Sigma song featuring Paloma Faith, and "Last Night" by the pop-rock band The Vamps.

In 2015, he co-wrote and feature in the song "Trouble" in Avicii second studio album, Stories.

In 2016, he co-wrote the song "Sunlight" together with Irish lyricist Ronan Hardiman for the Eurovision Song Contest 2016, in which the song was performed by Nicky Byrne. The song subsequently failed to qualify for the final.

Also in 2016, Hector co-wrote "On Your Side" by the Veronicas, the first single from their 2021 fifth album Human and also contributed to "Stealing Cars" on their 2021 fourth album Godzilla.

In 2017, he co-wrote "I Help You Hate Me" on Sunrise Avenue's album Heartbreak Century.

In 2018, he co-wrote "Love" on Kylie Minogue's album Golden.

In 2020, he co-wrote "Habit" and "Perfect Now" on Louis Tomlinson's album Walls.

In 2021, he co-wrote "Advice" on Shinee member Lee Tae-min's EP Advice.

In 2022 he contributed to the Sugababes album The Lost Tapes.

== Awards ==
In 2000, Hector won a BMI Pop Award for his work with Westlife's Swear It Again. In 2003, Hector won a BMI Country Award and BMI London Award for his work on Trace Adkins' Help Me Understand. Hector won an ASCAP award in 2005 for his work on Rascal Flatts' Feels Like Today and The Pussycat Dolls' I Hate This Part. He also won at the 2010 Brit Awards for his work on JLS' Beat Again. Hector was recognised as one of the 2012 top 25 songwriters by ASCAP. He was nominated for an Ivor Novella songwriting award for Best Selling UK single for "All This Time". In 2013, Hector won BMI Awards for The Wanted's "Glad You Came" and Nicki Minaj's "Starships," which also won a BMI R&B/Hip-Hop Award for Song of the Year. In 2014, he received the BMI Pop Award for One Direction's "Best Song Ever". In addition to his music awards, Hector was included in the 2019 edition of the Powerlist, ranking the 100 most influential Black Britons.

== Influences ==
Hector credits his musical tastes to his upbringing. His father favoured rock and R&B while his mother listened to country and classical music. His songwriting influences include Jimmy Jam and Terry Lewis, Burt Bacharach, Hal Davis, Babyface and Rodgers and Hammerstein.

== Personal life ==
Hector was born in Hackney and grew up in Surrey, where he currently resides.
