= In My Blood (The Veronicas song) =

Single by The Veronicas

from the album Godzilla
- Released: 10 June 2016
- Genre: Dance-pop
- Length: 3:20
- Label: Sony Music
- Songwriters: Anthony Egizii; David Musumeci; Lisa Origliasso; Jessica Origliasso
- Producer: DNA

The Veronicas singles chronology
"Chains" (2015)	"In My Blood" (2016)	"On Your Side" (2016)

"In My Blood" is a song by Australian pop duo The Veronicas for their fourth studio album, Godzilla (2021). It was co-written by The Veronicas twins, Lisa Origliasso and Jessica Origliasso, along with Anthony Egizii and David Musumeci and produced by the latter two under the collective name DNA. The track was released on 10 June 2016 as the album's first single.

== Composition ==
"In My Blood" was co-written by The Veronicas (Jessica Origliasso and Lisa Origliasso) along with Anthony Egizii and David Musumeci in Sydney. The duo have previously collaborated with the latter two on their 2014 single "You Ruin Me".

The duo credit Kylie Minogue as an inspiration for the sound of the song. Speaking about the sound, Robbie Daw of Idolator compared the recording to other dance-pop tracks saying, "'In My Blood' is a dreamy foray into dance-pop territory that has shades of Kylie Minogue, Robyn and even Texas." In the chorus the duo sing "we don’t have to wait all night to know if this is really love. We don’t have to wait all night ‘cause I can feel you in my blood," with a throbbing bass line that transitions into the hook with a robotic drop.

== Artwork and release ==
On 2 June 2016 The Veronicas announced the release of their new single, "In My Blood", by posting the official artwork on their Twitter account. The visual features The Veronicas standing side by side, completely naked and covered from neck to toes in glittery magenta body paint with palm trees in the background. The artwork was shot in Los Angeles by Sasha Samsonova whom the twins came across on Instagram. The Veronicas cited Mystique, the human anatomy and aliens as inspirations for the cover.

== Reception ==
Joey Nolfi of Entertainment Weekly said "In My Blood" had a similar vibe to their 2012 single "Lolita". He described the track as, "a subtle banger prime for the summer season, with crystalline electronic production (and bongos!) accompanying a killer hook." Mike Wass of Idolator called it "one of their best singles to date."

=== Accolades ===
"In My Blood" received three ARIA Music Awards nominations in 2016 for Best Group, Best Pop Release and Song of the Year.

At the Queensland Music Awards of 2017, the song won Highest Selling Single.

== Music video ==
The official music video for "In My Blood" debuted on The Voice Australia on June 26 when The Veronicas filled in as judges for Joel Madden and Benji Madden of Good Charlotte. It was uploaded on The Veronicas' official Vevo account on the following day. The video features the sisters in red dresses with red hair wrecking a room. The room and everything else in it is red. The video "rewinds" and "flash-forwards" several times as the room is being wrecked. It ends with Lisa and Jess sitting on a red couch.

== Live performances ==
"In My Blood" was performed for the first time on The Voice Australia on 26 June 2016 when The Veronicas twins filled in as judges for Joel Madden and Benji Madden of Good Charlotte. The duo also performed on Today and NFL Footy Show and AFL Footy Show. On November 23, 2016, they made a notorious performance on ARIA Awards wearing red latex jackets and then taking it off, being covered in red glitter and topless as they had been nominated for "Apple Song of the Year".

== Charts ==
=== Weekly charts ===
Chart (2016)	Peak position
Australia (ARIA)	1
New Zealand (Recorded Music NZ)	31

=== Year-end charts ===
Chart (2016)	Position
Australia (ARIA)	57

== Certifications ==
Region	Certification	Certified units/sales
Australia (ARIA)	2× Platinum	140,000^{‡}
New Zealand (RMNZ)	Platinum	30,000^{‡}
^{‡} Sales+streaming figures based on certification alone.

== Release history ==
Country	Date	Format	Label	Ref.
Worldwide	10 June 2016	Digital download	Sony Music	
Australia	24 June 2016	CD single	Sony Music	
United Kingdom	9 September 2016	Radio airplay	RCA	
Worldwide	25 December 2016	LEAF remix	Sony Music	
