= Biting My Tongue =

2020 single by The Veronicas

Single by The Veronicas

from the album Human
- Released: 3 July 2020
- Length: 3:06
- Label: Sony
- Songwriters: Jessica Origliasso; Anthony Egizii; David Musumeci; Lisa Origliasso
- Producer: DNA

The Veronicas singles chronology
"Ugly" (2019)	"Biting My Tongue" (2020)	"Godzilla" (2021)

"Biting My Tongue" is a song by Australian pop duo The Veronicas, released as a single on 3 July 2020 through Sony Music Australia as the lead single from their fifth studio album Human (2021).

== Background ==
The release of "Biting My Tongue" was announced by The Veronicas in late June 2020 along with the title of their fifth studio album Human. On the single's release date, they also uploaded a preview for the song's music video.

Jessica Origliasso described the song as "really about saying 'I need to declare my undying love for you. No regrets." with Lisa Origliasso adding:

"Vulnerability is fearlessness. To embrace that and realise that vulnerability is strength, by embracing that nothing feels better. Jess and I tend to say it all. We'd rather have no regrets, than ever wonder. We've always followed our hearts in that regard. We'd rather say too much than say nothing at all."

== Music video ==
"Biting My Tongue" marked the directorial debut for The Veronicas. The music video features twins Bud and Aidan Brennan Williams. The video was released on July 21, 2020.

== Critical reception ==
Rolling Stone described "Biting My Tongue" as an "exuberant pop anthem which captures the pair at their absolute best".

== Track listing ==
Digital download

1. "Biting My Tongue" – 3:06

== Charts ==
Chart (2020)	Peak position
Australia Airplay (Radiomonitor)	31
Australian Artist Singles (ARIA)	18
Australia Digital Song Sales (Billboard)	5
