= Gothic Summer =

Studio album by the Veronicas
- Released: 22 March 2024
- Length: 21:46
- Label: Big Noise
- Producer: John Feldmann

The Veronicas chronology
Human (2021)	Gothic Summer (2024)

Singles from Gothic Summer
- 1. "Perfect" Released: 20 October 2023; 2. "Detox" Released: 15 December 2023; 3. "Here to Dance" Released: 9 February 2024

Gothic Summer is the sixth studio album by Australian duo the Veronicas, released on 22 March 2024. It was announced in October 2023.

In an interview with Rolling Stone, Jess said "The whole theme of Gothic Summer is that it's basically exploring social commentary on what we think is reality versus how we create our reality. It's a very metaphorical album."

The duo also reported that some songs had been influenced by bands like The B-52's and The Cramps: "[It's] more of the music that we grew up listening to, rather than what you would expect The Veronicas to make for a radio song, if that makes sense."

== Reception ==
Zoë Radas from Stack Magazine called Gothic Summer "a triumphant return for the duo, which showcases their signature sound while exploring exciting new territory, delivering a pop masterpiece with a stormy vein twisted through its track list." Radas said "The album delves into themes of self-discovery, emotional obsession, societal pressures and the complexities of human relationships, all with a healthy dose of self-awareness."

== Track listing ==
Gothic Summer track listing
No.	Title	Writer(s)	Length
1.	"Perfect"	Jessica Origliasso; Lisa Origliasso; John Feldmann; Travis Barker; Sierra Deaton	2:33
2.	"Detox"	J. Origliasso; L. Origliasso; Feldmann; Jordan Brasko Gable	3:00
3.	"Here to Dance"	J. Origliasso; L. Origliasso; Cate Downey; Feldmann	2:05
4.	"Savage" (featuring Kerser)	J. Origliasso; L. Origliasso; Feldmann; Deaton; Scott Froml	3:13
5.	"Invisible"	J. Origliasso; L. Origliasso; Feldmann; Deaton	3:04
6.	"Ribcage"	J. Origliasso; L. Origliasso; Feldmann; Deaton	3:01
7.	"Jungle"	J. Origliasso; L. Origliasso; Feldmann; Deaton	2:19
8.	"Perfect" (acoustic)	J. Origliasso; L. Origliasso; Feldmann; Barker; Deaton	2:31
Total length:			21:46

== Personnel ==
The Veronicas

- Jessica Origliasso – vocals
- Lisa Origliasso – vocals

Additional contributors

- John Feldmann – production, mixing, mastering
- Connor Daniel – additional production, mixing, engineering, guitars
- Scot Stewart – additional production, mixing, engineering, guitars
- Dan Trapp – additional production, engineering, guitars
- Dylan McLean – additional production, mixing, engineering
- Ryan Linvill – co-production on "Perfect"

== Charts ==
Chart performance for Gothic Summer
Chart (2024)	Peak position
Australian Albums (ARIA)	6

== Release history ==
Release history and formats for Gothic Summer
Region	Date	Label	Format	Catalogue
Various	22 March 2024	Big Noise	CD; digital download	
Australia	26 April 2024	Big Noise	LP	BNMG144646.1
