= Zeke and Simon Hawkins =

American filmmakers

Zeke Hawkins and Simon Hawkins are independent film directors and brothers, often referred to as the Hawkins brothers.

Their directorial feature Bad Turn Worse won the Audience Award for American Independents at AFI Fest.

== Early life ==
The Hawkins brothers grew up in Darien, Connecticut.

== Career ==
The Hawkins brothers directed the 2013 film Bad Turn Worse, originally titled We Gotta Get Out of This Place with Simon as editor. The film premiered at the Toronto International Film Festival, screened at Austin's Fantastic Fest, and won the Audience Award at AFI Fest. The New York Times called it a "juicy neo-noir". The cast included Jeremy Allen White and Mackenzie Davis.

Spending more than two months living in Texas, the Hawkins brothers' interest in the horizontal landscape and low-rise architecture of the area became a key part of the film. Todd Gilchrist of IndieWire noted the film "offers the kind of clean, elegant storytelling whose emotional impact eclipses the cosmetic horrors of its counterparts while announcing the arrival of considerable new filmmaking talents.

Bad Turn Worse was released theatrically on November 14, 2013 and was acquired by Starz.
