= Underdogs (2013 American film) =

- Directed by: Doug Dearth
- Screenplay by: Dave Latham
- Produced by: Doug Dearth; Tom Rooker; Bill Fishman
- Starring: Alex Keener; D. B. Sweeney; William Mapother; Richard Portnow; Logan Huffman; Maddie Hasson; Charlie Carver; Melora Walters; Jay Thomas; Natalie Imbruglia; Joe Namath
- Cinematography: Sean Conaty
- Edited by: Michael Mayhew
- Music by: David Robbins
- Distributed by: Media Service Corporation; Freestyle Releasing; Shoreline Entertainment
- Release dates: April 2013 (United States); May 14, 2014 (VOD release in Australia)
- Running time: 102 minutes
- Countries: United States; Australia
- Language: English

Underdogs is a 2013 football sports drama film directed by Doug Dearth. The film is loosely based on true events which occurred in and around Canton, Ohio.

== Plot ==
Bobby Burkett (Logan Huffman) is a promising quarterback for a struggling high-school football team. Vince DeAntonio (D. B. Sweeney) is a former college football offensive coordinator, who abruptly resigned five years earlier, and has now become coach at the high school. The coach realizes the team needs more depth, and recruits several unlikely new players. Over the course of the season, Bobby falls for Renee (Maddie Hasson) a cheerleader at a rival high school, who also is the love interest of the rival school's quarterback (Charlie Carver). Bobby's father (William Mapother), is an inventor who works for the rival quarterback's father (Richard Portnow). The inventor gets sued by his employer over the intellectual property rights to a new space heater design, and must struggle to keep his invention. The employer's company is also planning to move manufacturing to Mexico, eliminating jobs in the community. The story climaxes in a charity football game between the rival teams, which serves as a rallying point for the inventor's family, the school, and the community.

== Cast ==
- Alex Keener as Reggie "BuzzSaw" Streeter
- D. B. Sweeney as Vince DeAntonio
- William Mapother as Bill Burkett
- Richard Portnow as John Handon II
- Logan Huffman as Bobby Burkett
- Maddie Hasson as Renee Donohue
- Charlie Carver as John Handon III
- Melora Walters as Nancy Smith-Burkett
- Jay Thomas as Mike Mayhew
- Natalie Imbruglia as Michelle Stratton
- Joe Namath as himself

== See also ==
- St. Thomas Aquinas High School Knights, the high school football team the film is loosely based on.
