= The Preppie Connection =

- Theatrical release poster
- Directed by: Joseph Castelo
- Written by: Ashley Rudden; Joseph Castelo
- Produced by: Joseph Castelo; Billy Raftery; Adam Folk; Joseph Mensch; Carlo Sirtori; Charlie Bunting; Eric Schultz; Travis Burgess
- Starring: Thomas Mann; Lucy Fry; Logan Huffman; Sam Page; Robert Gorrie; Dylan Blue; Jessica Rothe; Guillermo Arribas; Hemky Madera; Amy Hargreaves; Bill Sage
- Cinematography: Brett Jutkiewicz
- Edited by: Giacomo Ambrosini
- Music by: Sam Bisbee
- Production companies: Coalition Films; Relic Pictures; Bullet Pictures; Mensch Productions; Parallell Cinéma
- Distributed by: IFC Films
- Release dates: October 10, 2015 (Hamptons Film Festival); March 18, 2016 (United States)
- Running time: 95 minutes
- Countries: United States; France
- Language: English
- Box office: $11,558

The Preppie Connection is a 2015 crime drama film co-written and directed by Joseph Castelo, based on the infamous 1984 incident where Choate Rosemary Hall student Derek Oatis, along with a handful of friends, ran a cocaine smuggling operation on the school's campus. The film stars Thomas Mann, Lucy Fry, Logan Huffman, Sam Page, Jessica Rothe, and Bill Sage. It had world premiere at the Hamptons International Film Festival on October 10, 2015. It was released in the United States on March 18, 2016, in select theaters and through video on demand by IFC Films.

== Premise ==
In 1984 Wallingford, Connecticut, a private school student uses connections to create a drug trafficking network at his school which leads him and his friends into the dangerous world of drug cartels.

== Cast ==
- Thomas Mann as Tobias Hammel
- Lucy Fry as Alexis Hayes
- Sam Page as Mr. Jennings
- Jessica Rothe as Laura
- Guillermo Arribas as Fidel
- Bill Sage as Mike Hammel
- Logan Huffman as Ellis Tynes
- Amy Hargreaves as Ingrid
- Ryan Ward as Piper
- Hemky Madera as Raul
- Keenan Joliff as Topper
- Robert Gorrie as Ben
- Daniel Covin as Chip
- Tom Tammi as Dr. Fielding
- Teresa Yenque as Calista
- Dylan Blue as Dennis
- Jimmy Brewer as Michael
- David Vega as Ramon
- Harry Sutton Jr as Ed Bradley
- Doug Plaut as Chuck

== Production ==
In January 2013, it was announced that Evan Peters, Bella Heathcote had been cast in the lead roles of Tobias and Alex respectively, and the project had been written and directed by Joseph Castelo. However, either Peters and Heathcote dropped out or were recast, in July 2014, Lucy Fry was cast in the role of Alexis. The following day, it was announced that Thomas Mann and Logan Huffman had joined the cast of the film.

=== Filming ===
Principal photography took place in New York City from July 21 to August 9, 2014. with production beginning in Puerto Rico on August 12, 2014.

== Release ==
The film had its world premiere at the Hamptons International Film Festival on October 10, 2015. It was also screened at the Mill Valley Film Festival on October 15, 2015. In December 2015, IFC Films acquired distribution rights to the film. The film was released on March 18, 2016, in select theaters and through video on demand.

== Critical reception ==
The Preppie Connection received negative reviews from film critics. It holds an 11% approval rating on review aggregator website Rotten Tomatoes, based on 9 reviews, with an average rating of 5/10. On Metacritic, the film holds a rating of 34 out of 100, based on 6 critics, indicating "generally unfavorable reviews".

Dennis Harvey of Variety gave the film a negative review writing: "Unconvincingly presented in a way that belies the factual basis of a case that won national notoriety at the time, the film will make serviceable small-screen fodder, but lacks the deeper insight or distinguishing directorial style that might have tempted arthouse distributors."
