= Refuge (2012 film) =

- Theatrical release poster
- Directed by: Jessica Goldberg
- Screenplay by: Jessica Goldberg
- Based on: Refuge by Jessica Goldberg
- Produced by: Jack Heller; Dallas Sonnier
- Starring: Krysten Ritter; Brian Geraghty; Logan Huffman; Madeleine Martin
- Cinematography: Doug Emmett
- Edited by: Zach Wolf
- Music by: The Milk Carton Kids
- Production companies: Caliber Media Company; Paper Street Films; Lascaux Films
- Distributed by: Strand Releasing
- Release dates: October 6, 2012 (HIFF); March 28, 2014 (United States; limited)
- Running time: 84 minutes
- Country: United States
- Language: English

Refuge is a 2012 American drama film written and directed by Jessica Goldberg, based on her play of the same name. It stars Krysten Ritter, Brian Geraghty, Logan Huffman, and Madeleine Martin

== Plot ==
After her parents disappear, Amy drops out of college to care for her two younger siblings. Sam, a man with whom Amy has had a one-night stand, requests to rent space at Amy's house, and a romance develops between the two.

== Cast ==
- Krysten Ritter as Amy
- Brian Geraghty as Sam
- Logan Huffman as Nat
- Madeleine Martin as Lucy
- Juliet Garrett as Molly
- Chris Papavasiliou as Gary
- Joe Pallister as Steve

== Production ==
Filming took place in Southampton, New York, in February 2011 and took about a month.

== Release ==
Refuge premiered at the 2012 Hamptons International Film Festival.

== Reception ==
As of June 2020, the film holds a 33% approval rating on Rotten Tomatoes, a review aggregator, based on nine reviews with an average score of 5.62/10. Metacritic rated it 34/100 based on six reviews. John DeFore of The Hollywood Reporter called it a "sincere but unconvincing drama" that suffers in the adaptation to film. Neil Genzlinger of The New York Times called it "a fragmentary, unconvincing effort to trace the emergence of a familial bond". Sheri Linden of the Los Angeles Times wrote, "Explained rather than inhabited, the characters are half-formed, and their low-grade depression infects the underpowered storytelling."
