= Think of Me (The Veronicas song) =

Single by The Veronicas

from the album Human
- Released: 29 March 2019
- Genre: Electropop
- Length: 3:04
- Label: Sony
- Songwriter(s): Lisa Origliasso; Jessica Origliasso; Roberto De Sá; Isabella Kearney-Nurse
- Producer(s): xSDTRK; De Sá

The Veronicas singles chronology
"The Only High" (2017)	"Think of Me" (2019)	"Restless" (2019)

"Think of Me" is a song by Australian pop duo The Veronicas, released as the second single from their album Human on 29 March 2019 through Sony Music Australia. It is the duo's first single since the release of "The Only High" in June 2017.

Remixes were released on 14 June 2019.

== Background and composition ==
Mamamia wrote that the song is about the "aftermath of a toxic relationship, including the lines: 'I underestimated how complicated you are/I don't miss being hated.'"

Musically, "Think of Me" is an electropop song that has been described as a breakup anthem. It contains "bittersweet" synths and lyrics that have been referred to as "brutally honest". The chorus, which contains the lyrics "Do you miss me in your sheets?/ Do you miss me in your bed?/ The way we talk all night/ The way I give you head", has been called "raunchy".

== Critical reception ==
Allison Stubblebine, writing for Nylon, called the song the "perfect bittersweet ode to getting over a relationship; a little bit sad and nostalgic, but encouraging of owning your worth and moving on". Mike Wass of Idolator labelled the song "easily the duo's most arresting single since "You Ruin Me", and deserves to find a lot of at home and abroad".

== Track listing ==
Digital download

1. "Think of Me" – 3:04

Digital download (Remixes)

1. "Think of Me" (Basenji Remix) – 3:40
2. "Think of Me" (Alex Wildwood Gucci Remix) – 3:09
3. "Think of Me" (Alphalove Remix) – 3:09
4. "Think of Me" (Alphalove Extended Remix) – 4:09
5. "Think of Me" (DJ Sure & Chris Daniel Remix) – 3:32
6. "Think of Me" (DJ Sure & Chris Daniel Extended) – 6:01

== Credits and personnel ==
Adapted from Tidal.

- Lisa Origliasso – lead vocals, songwriter
- Jessica Origliasso – lead vocals, songwriter
- Isabella Kearney-Nurse – songwriter
- Roberto De Sá – songwriter, producer
- xSDTRK – producer
- Leon Zervos – mastering engineer
- Miles Walker – mixing engineer

== Charts ==
Chart (2019)	Peak position
Australia (ARIA)	70
New Zealand Hot Singles (RMNZ)	22

== Certifications ==
Region	Certification	Certified units/sales
Australia (ARIA)	Gold	35,000^{‡}
^{‡} Sales+streaming figures based on certification alone.
