= The Veronicas (album) =

2014 studio album by the Veronicas

Studio album by The Veronicas
- Released: 21 November 2014
- Recorded: 2010–2014
- Studios: Los Angeles, Nashville, New York City and Sydney
- Genre: Progressive pop
- Length: 48:54
- Label: Sony Music
- Producers: Alex Shield; Chris Loco; DNA; Dreamlab; Martin Hansen; Nellee Hooper; Roger Alan Nichols; Ruffian; Sandy Chila; Toby Gad

The Veronicas chronology
Hook Me Up (2007)	The Veronicas (2014)	Godzilla (2021)

Singles from The Veronicas
- 1. "You Ruin Me" Released: 19 September 2014; 2. "If You Love Someone" Released: 21 November 2014; 3. "Cruel" Released: 21 January 2015

The Veronicas is the self-titled third studio album by Australian duo The Veronicas. It was issued on 21 November 2014 as their first release with Sony Music Australia following their departure from former label Sire Records (Warner Music). The album comes seven years after their second record Hook Me Up (2007). When they were still with Sire at the time, their album was to be issued under the title Life on Mars with a 2012 release date before it was pushed back and eventually shelved, leading to their split from the label in October, 2013.

The Veronicas, which was produced from 2010-2014, features collaborations with Butch Vig, Nellee Hooper, Daniel Johns and long time collaborator Toby Gad. The music on the album slightly differs from their previous pop rock/electronic rock albums, featuring a "progressive pop" sound, drawing inspiration from numerous genres such as blues, dubstep, trip hop, rock and roll, soul, EDM, folk, grunge and rap.

The Veronicas debuted and peaked at number-two on the Australian Albums Chart, becoming their third consecutive number-two chart peak in Australia. The first single from the album, "You Ruin Me", debuted at number-one on the Australian Singles Chart where it stayed for three weeks and became their second number-one hit in the country, following "Hook Me Up" in 2007.

To promote The Veronicas, the duo made various television and radio appearances in Australia and Europe. Additionally, they performed live at venues which included supporting 5 Seconds of Summer on the USA leg of their Rock Out with Your Socks Out Tour. They also headlined their own tour, Sanctified Tour, in Australia and the UK during February and March in 2015.

== Background ==
Following the release of their second studio album Hook Me Up in 2007, The Veronicas gained success with their first Australian number-one hit "Hook Me Up" and their global breakthrough song "Untouched". To support the album, the duo embarked on two tours: the Australian Hook Me Up Tour and their global Revenge Is Sweeter Tour in 2007 and 2009, respectively. Once touring had ended in 2010 they had enough of promoting the album and were "ready to move on." Feeling a sense of loss of identity and a need to rediscover themselves Jessica and Lisa decided to part ways temporarily. When they reconnected during 2010, Jessica and Lisa collaborated with Butch Vig, Nellee Hooper, Daniel Johns and long time collaborator Toby Gad to begin work on their third album.

Two years later, having not released any music, the duo announced, through a teaser video, that their new single "Lolita" would come out on 27 July 2012. They also announced that Life on Mars was the title of their third album. "Lolita" was a moderate success in Australia, peaking at number 23 on the ARIA Singles Chart and attaining a gold certification. Initially Life on Mars was to be released by the end of 2012, however, Warner Music pushed the date back to 2013. Throughout 2013, Warner Music went through internal changes which caused further delays for the third album's release. By October 2013, having still not released new music, Life on Mars was mysteriously shelved.

Having been barred from releasing an album since 2007, the duo had had enough. When they were shortlisted for the Oz Artist of the Year Awards they chose to vent their frustrations on their official Facebook page with a message that said: "Despite our record label not allowing us to release music this year, we are still nominated in the top 50 for 'Oz artist of the year' awards!" They concluded the post with, "HELP US shove it in their faces, and please VOTE at the link below!!" Lisa and Jessica eventually hired a lawyer in a bid to get out of their contractual obligations with the label and were successful, so by 2013 The Veronicas became an independent act. Releasing a statement which described the struggles experienced with Warner, they said, "After 5 years of being in a 'Warner Brothers Records Lockdown', we are officially able to move forward RELEASING and Recording music without our past label dictating our creative journey, or withholding our musical releases + touring." By April 2014, The Veronicas signed with Sony Music and continued working on their record which was re-named The Veronicas.

== Music and lyrics ==
For The Veronicas, Jessica and Lisa wanted to create a "progressive pop" album drawing on inspiration from genres such as blues, dubstep, trip hop, rock and roll, grunge, soul, classical music, progressive rock, EDM, pop and rap. Wanting to make an album which differed from their more familiar pop rock sound, Lisa said that this album would be "eclectic" and not "predictable in any way." Lisa said "We go from something like "Sanctified," which, to be honest, wasn't written with the idea of being a Veronicas track. That was very much written when I was in Nashville and I was immersing myself in the blues and roots-y, swampy soul singing. Then we were working with Billy Corgan we did a "fuck you" kind of track "Did You Miss Me," which we rap on, which is a completely different thing. We get poppy with "Cold," and bring it back to an acoustic song like "You and Me" which could be considered a little bit folk-y, country" " Lisa said "I remember we really got into trip hop and decided we were going to make a trip hop album. I then got on a bluesy-rock-swampy-soul kick after we'd spent some time in Nashville. Eventually we came back around to songs like Cruel – the stuff people identify with The Veronicas." In an interview with Stephanie Anderson of BuzzFeed, the duo elaborated on the change from their first two albums, with Jessica saying: "If things were one dimensional on the first and second record, like, we would say exactly how we felt, and it was all just, total passion, we really didn't overthink it, we just put down what we were feeling, [this record] is more, 3D-4D... There's more depth and there's more thought, and more light and shade."

== Reception ==
=== Critical response ===
Professional ratings
Review scores
Source	Rating
Allmusic	4.5/5 stars
The Courier-Mail	3.5/5 stars
The Guardian	3/5 stars
Herald Sun	3.5/5 stars
The Music	2.5/5 stars
Music Connection	8/10
mX	2.5/5 stars
Rolling Stone Australia	4/5 stars
The Sydney Morning Herald	4/5 stars

Cameron Adams of the Herald Sun named The Veronicas "album of the week" on 20 November 2014. Most of the tracks were deemed "effortless" and he welcomed their return to music saying, "The world of pop is a more exciting and interesting place with The Veronicas out of traction and back in action." Tim Byron of The Guardian welcomed the experimental sounds of "Sanctified", "Teenage Millionaire" and "You Ruin Me". However, he opined that some of the songs were "outdated" saying, "outside of these often interesting experiments, about a third of the album – such as "If You Love Someone" or "Mad Love" – reeks of a tired formula that the Origliasso sisters have clearly outgrown." Similarly, a writer for mX suggested that songs such as "Mad Love" and "Teenage Millionaire" were out-dated and would have been better additions to their previous album Hook Me Up (2007). However, compliments were given for the tracks "Line Of Fire," "Let Me Out" and "You Ruin Me" which the reviewer felt "hint[ed] at what might have been, but all too often this album gives doughnuts." Jenny Valentish of Rolling Stone Australia described The Veronicas as being "rife with trend-hopping chart-stormers" and awarded the album four stars. The Sydney Morning Herald reviewer Craig Mathieson gave the album four stars and praised the lyrics saying that several songs "marks their lyrical shift from the uneasy negotiations of adolescence to forging your identity as an adult." He felt that there could have been clearer editing, however he said that "nonetheless The Veronicas remain committed and creative." The Veronicas was well received by The Courier-Mail's Noel Mengel who praised tracks such as "Cold", "Cruel", "Sanctified", "Always", "Line of Fire" and "You and Me". However, he considered the 14 track album to be "too long." James d'Apice criticised the overly "derivative" album stating that "originality is not their strong suit", but admitted that it "doesn't prevent them from being fun!"

=== Commercial performance ===
In Australia, The Veronicas entered and peaked on the ARIA Albums Chart at number two on 1 December, and was certified gold denoting 35,000 copies shipped in Australia in its first week. Although midweek chart reports suggested that it might have had a number-one debut, the album was held off the top spot by Taylor Swift's 1989. The album became their third consecutive Australian number two album, with their previous two studio releases, The Secret Life Of... (2005) and Hook Me Up (2007), also peaking at that spot. The Veronicas spent one week at its peak position. 23 weeks in the top 20. It was later certified platinum for 70,000 copies shipped. In New Zealand, The Veronicas debuted and peaked at number 27 on the New Zealand Albums Chart, staying in the top 40 for just one week before dropping from the chart.

== Release and promotion ==
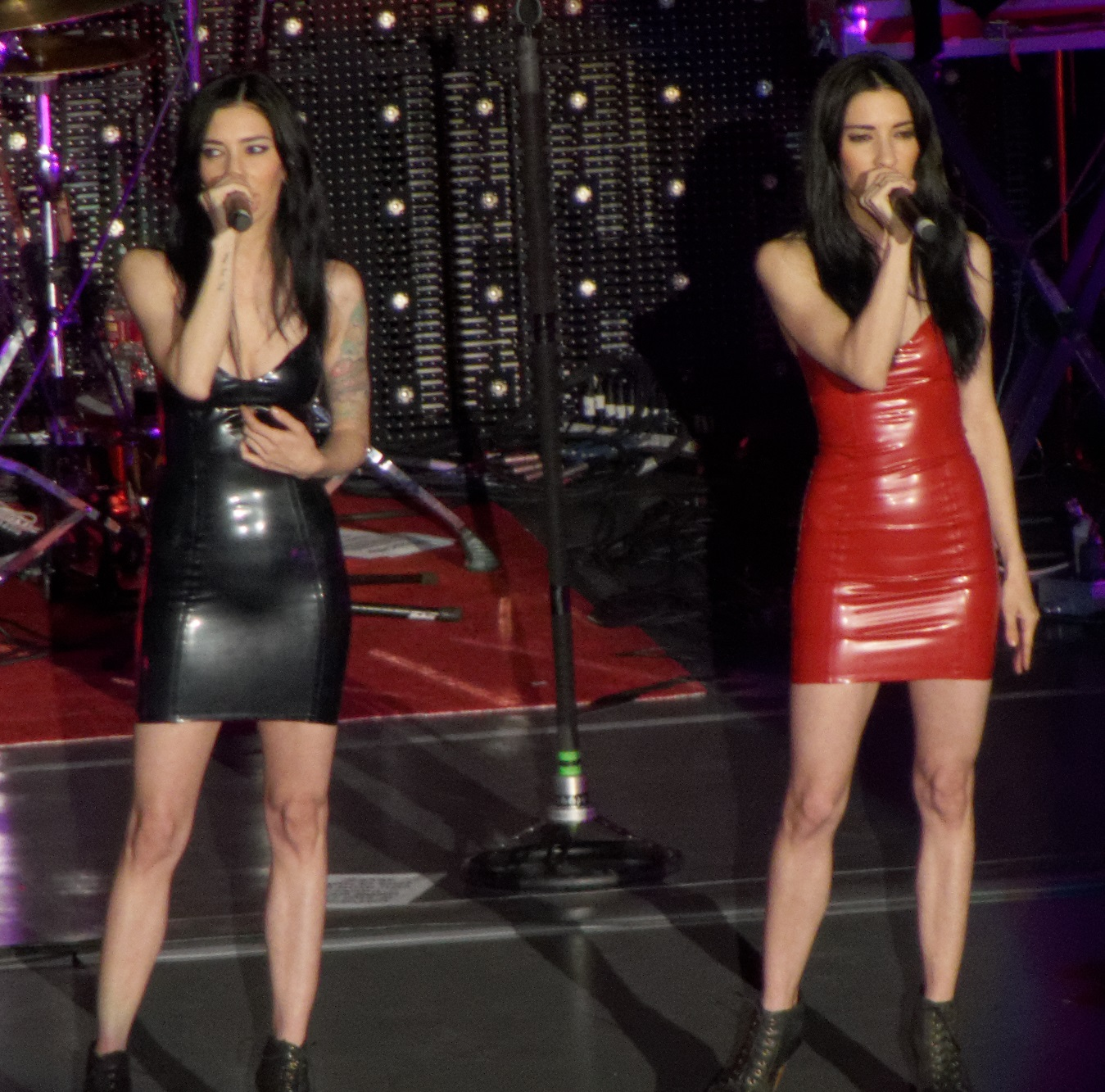
The Veronicas in 2014 during the Rock Out with Your Socks Out Tour.

The Veronicas was released in Australia and New Zealand on 21 November 2014. The album will be released in the United States on 24 February 2015. When the album was made available for pre-order in Australia on 24 October 2014 an iTunes countdown single, "Line of Fire", was shared as a downloadable track. During a question and answer session on their official Twitter page The Veronicas revealed that a deluxe edition of the album will also be released, however a release date has not been announced.

In May 2011, The Veronicas began releasing videos to YouTube showing their meetings with record labels and creating new music. By June 2011 they announced that they would perform new music at The Viper Room in August of that year. Performing in front of a sold-out crowd they debuted tracks "Dead Cool", "Whoa Oh", "Cold", "Let Me Out" and "Baby I'm Ready" which displayed a more "edgier rock sound" compared to their previous work. On 29 September 2014, The Veronicas performed "You Ruin Me" for the first time on The X Factor (Australia) live elimination show. They performed "You Ruin Me" on other television shows including the Australian version of Dancing with the Stars and Sunrise, where they also sang "If You Love Someone".

On 30 October, The Veronicas performed seven tracks from the album for the first time on radio for Today Network's World Famous Rooftop. The set included "If You Love Someone", "Cruel", "Did You Miss Me (I'm a Veronica)", "Sanctified", "Mad Love", "Cold" and "You Ruin Me". The duo supported 5 Seconds of Summer on the USA leg of their Rock Out with Your Socks Out Tour during November 2014 in Los Angeles and Phoenix. During the Phoenix shows, Jessica and Lisa wore identical figure hugging latex dresses in black and red, respectively, which were designed by Abigail Grey Danus.

=== Sanctified Tour ===
Sanctified Tour
- Tour by The Veronicas
- Location: Australia
- Associated album: The Veronicas
- Start date: 12 February 2015
- End date: 11 March 2015
- Legs: 2
- No. of shows: 10

The Veronicas concert chronology
- Revenge Is Sweeter Tour (2009); Sanctified Tour (2015)

On 19 November 2014, The Veronicas announced via their official Twitter account that they would embark on a month-long Australian tour to promote The Veronicas in 2015. The Australian leg began on 12 February 2015 in Perth and ended on 21 February in Brisbane. By 19 January 2015 the band announced that a UK leg would be added to the Sanctified Tour from 6–11 March. A US leg of the Sanctified Tour was planned throughout the month of June. However, these plans were cancelled after members of their band were unable to obtain working visas.

List of concerts, showing date, city, country, venue, opening act,
Date	City	Country	Venue	Opening act
Oceania
12 February 2015	Perth	Australia	Perth Concert Hall	Dean Ray
14 February 2015	Adelaide	Australia	Adelaide Entertainment Centre Theatre	—N/a
18 February 2015	Melbourne	Australia	Hamer Hall	Dean Ray
20 February 2015	Sydney	Australia	Enmore Theatre	Dean Ray
21 February 2015	Brisbane	Australia	Brisbane City Hall	Dean Ray
Europe
4 March 2015	Birmingham	England	Library, The Institute	Bad Flowers
6 March 2015	Glasgow	Scotland	Garage Glasgow	Bad Flowers
8 March 2015	Manchester	England	Manchester Academy	Bad Flowers
10 March 2015	Brighton	England	Brighton Concorde 2	Bad Flowers
11 March 2015	London	England	Heaven in London	Bad Flowers

==== Cancelled shows ====
List of concerts, showing date, city, country, venue, opening act,
Date	City	Country	Venue
North America
17 June 2015	Buffalo, New York	United States	Buffalo And Erie County Botanical Gardens
21 June 2015	Columbus	United States	Newport Music Hall
24 June 2015	Washington DC	United States	The Hamilton Live
26 June 2015	Nashville	United States	Public Square Park Downtown
27 June 2015	Nashville	United States	Public Square Park Downtown
29 June 2015	West Hollywood	United States	Troubadour

== Singles ==
"You Ruin Me" was released as The Veronicas lead single on 19 September 2014. The track debuted at number-one in Australia becoming their first chart topping hit in the country since "Hook Me Up" in 2007. The recording spent three weeks at the top and was certified double platinum by the Australian Record Industry Association (ARIA). "If You Love Someone" was confirmed as the album's second single when it debuted on Australian radio on 5 November 2014. The track debuted at number-five on the Australian Singles Chart, making it their second top five single from the album. Their next single commissioned was "Cruel".

== Track listing ==
The Veronicas
No.	Title	Writer(s)	Producer(s)	Length
1.	"Sanctified"	Jessica Origliasso; Lisa Origliasso; Tyler Bryant; Roger Alan Nichols	Roger Alan Nichols	3:19
2.	"Did You Miss Me (I'm a Veronica)"	J. Origliasso; L. Origliasso; Toby Gad; Josh Alexander; Billy Corgan	Toby Gad	2:45
3.	"Cruel"	J. Origliasso; L. Origliasso; Dan James; Leah Haywood; Rob Ellmore	Dreamlab; Ruffian	3:43
4.	"Line of Fire"	J. Origliasso; L. Origliasso; Gad; Laura Pergolizzi	Gad	3:06
5.	"Teenage Millionaire"	J. Origliasso; L. Origliasso; James; Haywood; Ellmore	Dreamlab; Ruffian	3:25
6.	"Born Bob Dylan"	J. Origliasso; L. Origliasso; Gad; Susan Cagle	Gad	3:38
7.	"Always"	Chris Loco; Emeli Sandé	Chris Loco	3:10
8.	"Mad Love"	J. Origliasso; L. Origliasso; Gad; Alexander	Gad	3:30
9.	"You Ruin Me"	J. Origliasso; L. Origliasso; Anthony Egizii; David Musumeci	DNA	3:51
10.	"More Like Me"	J. Origliasso; L. Origliasso; Dave Bassett; Josh Katz	Alex Shield	3:40
11.	"If You Love Someone"	J. Origliasso; L. Origliasso; Egizii; Musumeci; Katz	DNA	3:00
12.	"Cold"	J. Origliasso; L. Origliasso; Gary Clark	Nellee Hooper	3:54
13.	"Let Me Out"	J. Origliasso; L. Origliasso; Martin Hansen; Hayden Bell; Sarah Lundback Bell	Martin Hansen	4:45
14.	"You and Me"	J. Origliasso; L. Origliasso; Alex Dezen	Sandy Chila	3:35

== Charts ==
=== Weekly charts ===
Chart (2014)	Peak position
Australian Albums (ARIA)	2
New Zealand Albums (RMNZ)	27
UK Albums (Official Charts)	49
US Heatseekers Albums (Billboard)	5
US Independent Albums (Billboard)	41

=== Year-end charts ===
Chart (2014)	Position
Australian Albums (ARIA)	35
Chart (2015)	Position
Australian Albums (ARIA)	78

== Certifications ==
Region	Certification	Certified units/sales
Australia (ARIA)	Platinum	70,000^{^}
^{^} Shipments figures based on certification alone.

== Release history ==
Region	Date	Format	Label	Ref(s)
Australia	21 November 2014	CD; digital download	Sony Music	
New Zealand	21 November 2014	CD; digital download	Sony Music	
United States	24 February 2015	CD; digital download	Sony Music	
United Kingdom	16 March 2015	CD; digital download	Columbia Records	
