= The Only High =

Single by The Veronicas

from the album Godzilla
- Released: 2 June 2017
- Genre: Pop
- Length: 3:18
- Label: Sony Music Australia
- Songwriters: Lisa Origliasso; Jessica Origliasso; Shelly Peiken; Seann Bowe
- Producer: DNA

The Veronicas singles chronology
"On Your Side" (2016)	"The Only High" (2017)	"Think of Me" (2019)

"The Only High" is a song recorded by Australia pop duo The Veronicas for their fourth studio album, Godzilla (2021). The song debuted at number 79 on the Australian Singles Chart, later peaking at 41. A music video for the song was shot in London, but for unknown reasons was never released.

== Background and release ==
"The Only High" was co-written by The Veronicas' twins Jessica Origliasso and Lisa Origliasso, along with Seann Bowe and Shelly Peiken, the latter of whom collaborated with the duo on their first Australian number-one single, "Hook Me Up" ten years previously. On working with Peiken, Jessica said: “We just have some kind of chemistry with [Peiken] that you can’t explain. She really gets to the heart of us.”

Speaking to The Daily Telegraph about the inspiration behind "The Only High", Lisa described it as: “When you are in love, you want to shout it from the rooftop.” Regarding hers and Jessica's current love lives, Lisa added: “Jess and I are pretty open with our lives in that regard and we are very proud of our partners. We are both in very happy, committed places in our lives.”

On 31 May, a trailer was uploaded on The Veronicas official Instagram account announcing the release of "The Only High" on 2 June. In the trailer, a synth-pop "Trailer remix" of the track, remixed by Brisbane producer JOY, played in the background and featured visuals of Jessica and Lisa in a photoshoot on top of a building, next to burnt cars and surrounded by flowers. The duo are dressed in numerous outfits in the clip, which include floral suits similar to the ones featured on the single cover.

== Live performances ==
On 11 June, The Veronicas performed the song live for the first time on The Voice Australia. The duo also performed "The Only High" on television programs ABC News and Today. On radio, The Veronicas performed the track for Nova's Red Room on 14 June 2017.

== Charts ==
Chart (2017)	Peak position
Australia (ARIA)	41

== Release history ==
Country	Date	Format	Label	Ref(s)
Australia	2 June 2017	Digital download	Sony Music Australia	
