= On Your Side (The Veronicas song) =

Single by The Veronicas

from the album Human
- Released: 14 October 2016
- Recorded: 2016
- Studio: London, England
- Genre: Synth-pop; EDM
- Length: 2:51
- Label: Sony Music
- Songwriters: Lisa Origliasso; Jessica Origliasso; Wayne Hector; Jim Eliot
- Producers: Ollipop; Freddy Haggstam

The Veronicas singles chronology
"In My Blood" (2016)	"On Your Side" (2016)	"The Only High" (2017)

Music video
- "On Your Side" on YouTube

"On Your Side" is a song recorded by Australian pop duo The Veronicas for their fifth studio album Human. The Veronicas twins, Lisa Origliasso and Jessica Origliasso, co-wrote the song with Wayne Hector and Jim Eliot, while Swedish record producer Ollipop and Freddy Haggstam produced the track. It was released through Sony Music on 14 October 2016 as the album's first single.

== Composition ==
"On Your Side" is a synth-pop and EDM song written by The Veronicas (Jessica Origliasso and Lisa Origliasso) with British songwriters Wayne Hector and Jim Eliot. It was written and recorded in London, England and produced by Swedish record producer Ollipop. Critics have also noted influences of reggaeton and tropical house in song's musical styling.

Lyrically, the song is about wishing an ex-lover happiness in spite of the heartache caused by the relationship ending. "After you have loved and lived through different relationships," Jessica Origliasso said in explanation of the song's meaning, "you reach a place where there's a certain amount of acceptance that the love that you shared still exists even if the relationship doesn't."

== Reception ==
Robbie Daw of Idolator gave the song a positive review in which he noted the song's potential as a breakthrough in the US market. "This isn’t the sound you’d typically associate with the Origliasso twins," writes Daw, "but somehow, some way, Lisa and Jess just seem to get better and better with each release."

== Music video ==
The music video for the song written and directed by Ruby Rose was released to YouTube on 17 November 2016. It depicts a romantic relationship dealing with addiction.

== Track listing ==
Digital download

1. "On Your Side" – 2:51

CD single

1. "On Your Side" – 2:51
2. "In My Blood" (Leaf remix) – 3:28

== Charts ==
Chart (2016)	Peak position
Australia (ARIA)	19
New Zealand Heatseekers Singles (RMNZ)	5
Scottish Singles Sales (Official Charts)	97

== Certifications ==
Region	Certification	Certified units/sales
Australia (ARIA)	Platinum	70,000^{‡}
^{‡} Sales+streaming figures based on certification alone.

== Release history ==
Country	Date	Format	Label	Ref.
Worldwide	14 October 2016	Digital download	Sony Music	
Australia	4 November 2016	CD single	Sony Music	
