= Jessica Origliasso =

Australian singer-songwriter and producer (born 1984)

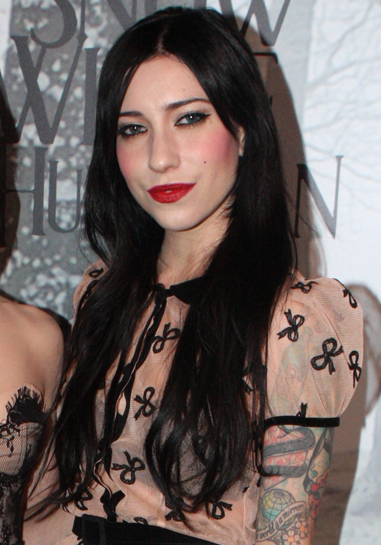
- Origliasso in 2012
- Born: Jessica Louise Origliasso; 25 December 1984 (age 41); Albany Creek, Queensland, Australia
- Occupations: Singer-songwriter, producer
- Years active: 2001–present
- Partner(s): Alex Smith (2020–present; engaged)
- Relatives: Lisa Origliasso (twin sister); Logan Huffman (brother-in-law)
- Musical career
- Genres: Electronic rock; dance-pop
- Instruments: Vocals; guitar; keyboards
- Labels: Sony Music Australia; Sire; Warner Bros.; Big Noise
- Member of: The Veronicas

Jessica Louise Origliasso (born 25 December 1984) is an Australian singer-songwriter and producer. She and her twin sister Lisa formed the pop band The Veronicas.

== Early life ==
Jessica Louise Origliasso was born in Queensland, Australia, the daughter of Italian-Australians, Joseph and Colleen Origliasso. She is older than her twin sister, Lisa, by one minute.

== Career ==
=== 2004–2009: The Veronicas ===
Lisa and Jessica impressed music executive Hayden Bell with their demo tracks, and were signed to Excalibur Productions Australia as songwriters in 2004. After being signed to Sydney based independent record label Engine Room Recordings, they received funding to travel the world to write and record demos with other songwriters. During this trip, they co-wrote songs that would be released by other artists, including: "What's Going On?" by Casey Donovan, "All About Us" by t.A.T.u. and "Faded" by Kate DeAraugo (also covered by Cascada). By the end of 2004 they travelled to America and signed with Sire Records, a subsidiary of Warner Music for a deal worth $2 million. Taking their name from a line in the film Heathers (1988), they called themselves The Veronicas. However the name was also connected to the Archie Comics character Veronica Lodge, leading to the owners suing them for trademark infringement, but resulted in a settlement which included the sisters appearing in the comics.

The following year, they released their debut album The Secret Life of... (2005), which spawned their first major hit "4ever" peaking at number two on the ARIA Singles Chart and certified platinum, denoting 70,000 copies shipped in Australia. The album sold almost half a million copies worldwide and earned them an ARIA Award for Best Pop Release. In 2007 they released their second album Hook Me Up and its eponymous single scored them their first number one hit on the ARIA Charts and was certified platinum. The following single, "Untouched" became their global breakthrough song, reaching the top twenty of the Billboard Hot 100 chart, and the top twenty in seven other countries, including number one in Ireland. It went on to be certified platinum in the United States, with over one million digital downloads. They embarked on the Revenge Is Sweeter tour, their first to go global, which began in February 2009 and ended December. After concluding the tour, Lisa and Jessica decided to take time off from the group. Having promoted their second album since 2007, they were "ready to move on" wanting to "discover whether they could create separately as well as individually."

=== 2010–present: Album delays, The Veronicas, Godzilla and Human ===
Jessica reunited with Lisa after their break in 2010 to begin working on The Veronicas third studio album. Their record label, Warner Music, went through major restructuring during this time which caused delays in releasing new music. Wanting to keep fans updated with the progress of their new work, they performed a set at The Viper Room in 2011. Months after this performance, in 2012, The Veronicas finally revealed that they would release a new song called "Lolita" for their new album, which was known as Life on Mars at the time. The single reached number twenty three on the ARIA Singles Chart and was certified gold. Life on Mars was to be released by the end of 2012, however, Warner Music pushed the date back to early 2013, and eventually the record was shelved altogether. Because of this, Lisa and Jessica hired a lawyer in a bid to get out of their contractual obligations with the label and were successful, so by 2013 The Veronicas became an independent act.

In April 2014, the Veronicas were signed to Sony Music Australia and began putting the finishing touches on their third album, which was renamed The Veronicas. The first single from the album, "You Ruin Me", debuted atop the ARIA Singles Chart, becoming their first number-one hit in the country since "Hook Me Up" in 2007. It stayed at the apex of the chart for three consecutive weeks and was certified double platinum. The Veronicas released various singles through 2016 to 2020, "In My Blood", "On Your Side", "The Only High", "Think of Me", and "Biting My Tongue". In 2021 they have released two back to back albums; Godzilla and Human. Jessica released her half of The Solo Project in September 2022 called "Seeing Stars". The Veronicas eventually signed with Big Noise in 2022. They released Gothic Summer in 2024

They also did a reality show for MTV in 2019, called: The Veronicas: Blood Is for Life

== Personal life ==
Origliasso was in a relationship with Ruby Rose in 2008. She was in a relationship with Smashing Pumpkins singer and songwriter Billy Corgan from 2010 to 2012; the two remained friends afterward. In the early 2010s, she also dated Michael Clifford of 5 Seconds of Summer. She dated Badflower singer Josh Katz from 2014 to 2016, and started dating Rose again in November 2016, which later ended in 2018. Jessica got engaged to girlfriend Alex Smith in 2022. Katz and Corgan contributed to The Veronicas (2014).

Origliasso is queer. Origliasso says she never hid her sexuality or public life and often expressed her sexuality in her songwriting and music.

== Philanthropy ==
In 2006, Origliasso and her sister, Lisa, joined Steve Irwin's Wildlife Warriors Worldwide, as ambassadors for charity that promotes the protection of animals and their natural environments.

In January 2009, Origliasso was asked to pose nude for PETA; this came after she was seen on the New York City Subway wearing a faux fur jacket with an anti-fur message on the back. She opted out of the nude shoot, but instead starred in an anti-fur campaign with Veronicas band mate Lisa.

The twins also joined a "Wear it with Pride" campaign to reform same-sex marriage laws in Australia for the 85 legislative changes made in 2010 to overturn discrimination against same-sex couples and their families. The campaign involved them wearing numbered T-shirts representing each legislative change.

In 2010, the twins were honoured as Wildlife Warriors of the year, by Steve Irwin's Australia Zoo, for their efforts in publicising wildlife and nature conservation on a worldwide scale.

Origliasso has been an active voice at same-sex marriage rallies around Australia, for legislative change, as well as speaking out in support of transgender awareness and legislative equality.

Origliasso has raised extensive awareness for Sea Shepherd internationally, visiting their ships and performing at their funding events.
