= Lisa Origliasso =

Australian singer-songwriter (born 1984)

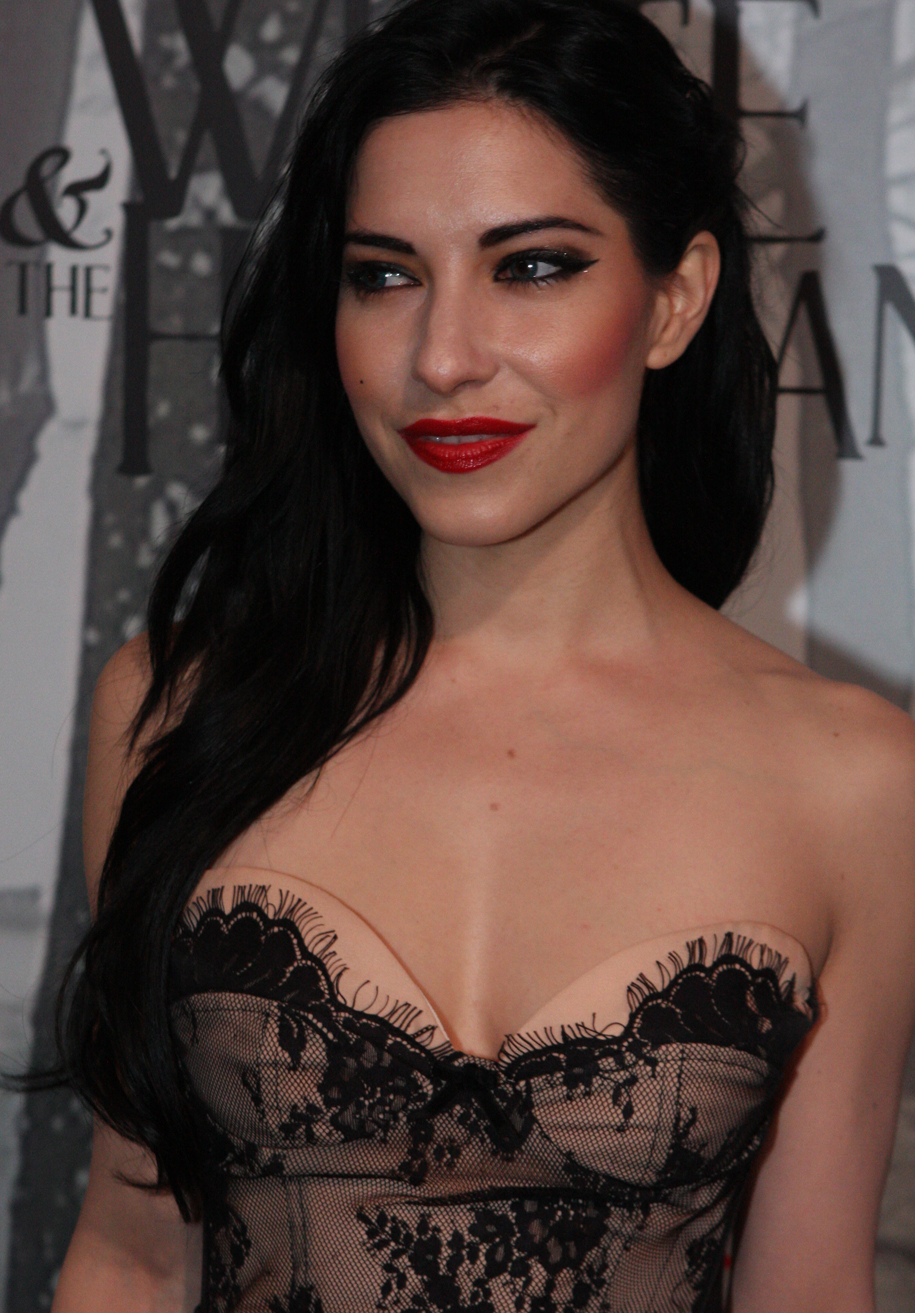
- Origliasso in 2012
- Born: Lisa Marie Origliasso; 25 December 1984 (age 41); Albany Creek, Queensland, Australia
- Occupation: Singer-songwriter
- Years active: 2001–present
- Spouse: Logan Huffman (m. 2018)
- Relatives: Jessica Origliasso (twin sister); Julian Origliasso (older brother)
- Musical career
- Genres: Electronic rock; dance-pop
- Instruments: Vocals; guitar; keyboards; percussion
- Labels: Sony Music Australia; Sire; Warner Bros.; Big Noise
- Member of: The Veronicas

Lisa Marie Origliasso (born 25 December 1984) is an Australian singer-songwriter. Born and raised in Albany Creek, Queensland, Lisa and her identical twin sister, Jessica Origliasso, performed in show business at a young age. Origliasso rose to fame in the 2000s when she and her sister formed the pop duo The Veronicas.

Prior to The Veronicas, the Origliassos had a small career in acting. In 2001, she had a recurring role alongside her sister in the children's television series Cybergirl as Sapphire Buxton. In 2007, she co-designed a fashion line with her sister, called The Veronicas, aimed at girls aged 7 to 14, for Target. Origliasso has been endorsed by Nu:U, Calvin Klein, Keds and Estée Lauder.

In late 2011, Origliasso started a group called the Dead Cool Dropouts with Tyler Bryant, mostly done using GarageBand on a Macintosh computer. They have released an EP of songs, titled "Write You Off", "Green Eyes Make Me Blue", and "Criminal Heart".

== Biography ==
=== 1984–2003: Early life and career beginnings ===
Lisa Marie Origliasso was born in Albany Creek, Queensland, Australia, to Italian-Australians Joseph and Colleen Origliasso. Lisa is the youngest child, being slightly younger than her twin sister, Jessica, who was born one minute before her. Their older brother, Julian Origliasso, is a music manager who manages their duo The Veronicas. The family was raised in Albany Creek, Queensland, and attended both Ferny Grove State High School and Wavell State High School.

The Origliasso sisters began their career at the age of five, performing at awards shows and sporting events as the Origliasso Twins, changing their name to "Lisa & Jessica" in their teen years, under which they released three albums. At age sixteen, Lisa and Jessica ventured into acting, being cast in a small role in the children's television series Cybergirl, as villains Emerald and Sapphire Buxton, respectively. In 2003, they formed another band with two of their friends called Teal and released a single called "Baby It's Over".

=== 2004–09: The Veronicas and Dead Cool Dropouts ===
Lisa and Jessica impressed music executive Hayden Bell with their demo tracks and were signed to Excalibur Productions Australia as songwriters in 2004. After being signed to Sydney-based independent record label Engine Room Recordings, they received funding to travel around the world to write and record demos with other songwriters. During this trip, they co-wrote songs that would go on to be released by other artists, including: "What's Going On?" by Casey Donovan, "All About Us" by t.A.T.u. and "Faded" by Kate DeAraugo (also covered by Cascada). By the end of 2004 they travelled to America and signed with Sire Records, a subsidiary of Warner Music for a deal worth $2 million. Taking their name from a line in the film Heathers (1988), they called themselves The Veronicas. However the name was also connected to the Archie Comics character Veronica Lodge, leading to the owners suing them for trademark infringement, but resulted in a settlement which included the sisters appearing in the comics.

The following year, they released their debut album, The Secret Life of... (2005), which spawned their first major hit, "4ever", peaking at number two on the ARIA Singles Chart and being certified platinum, denoting 70,000 copies shipped in Australia. The album sold almost half a million copies worldwide and earned them an ARIA Award for Best Pop Release. In 2007, they released their second album, Hook Me Up, and its eponymous single scored them their first number one hit on the ARIA Charts and was certified platinum. The following single, "Untouched", became their global breakthrough song, reaching the top twenty of the Billboard Hot 100 charts, and the top twenty in seven other countries, including number one in Ireland. It went on to be certified platinum in the United States, with over one million digital downloads. They embarked on the Revenge Is Sweeter tour, their first to go global, which began in February 2009 and ended December.

After concluding the tour, Lisa and Jessica decided to take a six-month hiatus from the duo. Having promoted their second album since 2007, they were "ready to move on" and wanting to "discover whether they could create separately as well as individually." Lisa spent her time listening to blues music and eventually travelled to Nashville to write, teaming up with American singer Tyler Bryant to form the Dead Cool Dropouts. They posted songs on their Tumblr account, which included "Green Eyes Make Me Blue", "Criminal Heart", "Write You Off", "Blame it on Me", "Playing for Keeps" and "Ju Ju Ya Ya".

=== 2010–present: Album delays, The Veronicas, Godzilla and Human ===
Lisa reunited with her sister after their break in 2010 to begin working on the Veronicas third studio album. Their record label, Warner Music, went through major restructuring during this time which caused delays in releasing new music. Wanting to keep fans updated with the progress of their new work, they performed a set at The Viper Room in 2011. Months after this performance, in 2012, the Veronicas finally revealed that they would release a new song called "Lolita" for their new album, which was known as Life on Mars at the time. The single reached number twenty three on the ARIA Singles Chart and was certified gold. Life on Mars was to be released by the end of 2012; however, Warner Music pushed the date back to early 2013, and eventually the record was shelved altogether. Because of this, Lisa and Jessica hired a lawyer in a bid to get out of their contractual obligations with the label and were successful, so by 2013 the Veronicas became an independent act.

In April 2014, the Veronicas were signed to Sony Music Australia and began putting the finishing touches on their third album, which was renamed The Veronicas. The first single from the album, "You Ruin Me", debuted atop the ARIA Singles Chart, becoming their first number-one hit in the country since "Hook Me Up" in 2007. It stayed at the apex of the chart for three consecutive weeks and was certified double platinum. The Veronicas released various singles through 2016 to 2020, "In My Blood", "On Your Side", "The Only High", "Think of Me", and "Biting My Tongue". During 2021, they released two albums: Godzilla and Human. Lisa released her half of The Solo Project in September 2022 called "Cruisin' On My Own". The Veronicas signed with Big Noise in 2022. They released Gothic Summer in 2024.

The duo was also featured on a reality TV show for MTV later on 2019 called: The Veronicas: Blood Is for Life.

== Personal life ==
In 2007, Origilasso began a relationship with Dean Geyer whom she met at the 2007 ARIA Awards. In April 2008, Origliasso publicly announced that she and Geyer were engaged. However, the engagement was later called off due to work commitments.

Origliasso married actor Logan Huffman on 4 November 2018. They had been dating since 2014.

In 2019, Origliasso announced that she has suffered an ectopic pregnancy and miscarried.

== Philanthropy ==
In 2006, Lisa and Jessica Origliasso joined Steve Irwin's Wildlife Warriors Worldwide, a charity that deals with the protection of animals and their natural environments.

Lisa and Jessica also joined a "Wear it with Pride" campaign to reform same-sex laws in Australia for the 85 legislative changes made in 2010 to overturn discrimination against same-sex couples and their families. The campaign involved them wearing numbered T-shirts representing each legislative change.

In 2010, the twins were honoured as Wildlife Warriors of the year for their efforts in publicising animal protection and conservation on a worldwide scale.
