= The Veronicas: Blood Is for Life =

2019 Australian reality TV series

- Genre: Reality television
- Starring: The Veronicas
- Opening theme: "Ugly" by The Veronicas
- Country of origin: Australia
- Original language: English
- No. of seasons: 1
- No. of episodes: 6

Production
- Executive producers: Jess Origliasso; Lisa Origliasso; Emma Clarke
- Producer: Haydn Butler
- Editors: Ryan Kermond; Jessica Bowen; Nick Maher
- Running time: 24 minutes
- Production company: Viacom International Studios

Original release
- Network: MTV Australia
- Release: 10 November – 15 December 2019

The Veronicas: Blood Is For Life is an Australian reality show first broadcast on MTV Australia in November 2019, starring pop duo The Veronicas.

== Background ==
The show was officially announced in May 2019, following a lunch between The Veronicas and Simon Bates, VP head of MTV APAC, with Bates explaining that "after that lunch, I was 100% making this show with them. They are absolutely perfect for MTV. We're perfect for them at this particular stage in their career." He further stated that "their brand and ours is so similar in that we're music, but we're also more than that, we're celebrity pop culture. They're all about design and style and fun, but they've been pop and rock. They're just so well matched with MTV as a brand". The Veronicas: Blood Is for Life premiered on MTV on 10 November 2019.

== Reception ==
Following the show's conclusion, in January 2020 The Music Network stated that The Veronicas: Blood Is for Life had "opened the doors for more local reality shows as well as its proven brands as Unplugged, TRL, Teen Mom and Cribs"; and that the show was at the time also being screened through MTV internationally, "with a particular push in the US, UK and parts of Europe where the act has a large fan base – before going on to YouTube."

== Episodes ==
No.	Title	Original release date
1	"Episode 1"	10 November 2019
2	"Episode 2"	17 November 2019
3	"Episode 3"	24 November 2019
4	"Episode 4"	1 December 2019
5	"Episode 5"	8 December 2019
6	"Episode 6"	15 December 2019
