= You Ruin Me =

2014 single by The Veronicas

Single by The Veronicas

from the album The Veronicas
- Released: 19 September 2014
- Recorded: Sony Music Studios, Sydney
- Genre: Pop
- Length: 3:50
- Label: Sony Music
- Songwriters: Anthony Egizii; David Musumeci; Lisa Origliasso; Jessica Origliasso
- Producer: DNA

The Veronicas singles chronology
"Lolita" (2012)	"You Ruin Me" (2014)	"If You Love Someone" (2014)

"You Ruin Me" is a song by Australian pop duo The Veronicas from their self-titled third studio album. Produced by DNA, the recording is the lead single from the album and their first musical release since "Lolita" in 2012. The track, which was released on 19 September 2014, was co-written by Anthony Egizii and David Musumeci along with The Veronicas' twins Lisa Origliasso and Jessica Origliasso. It became the duo's second number-one single in their native Australia, topping the ARIA Singles Chart for three weeks, and it reached the top 20 in New Zealand and the United Kingdom.

== Background ==
In 2012, The Veronicas released the song "Lolita" as the lead single from Life on Mars, the title of what was meant to be their third studio album. The recording was a moderate success, peaking at number twenty-three on the ARIA Charts and achieving a gold certification. Life on Mars was scheduled for release in the fourth quarter of 2012, however their record label Warner Music pushed the date back, and by October 2013 the album was mysteriously shelved.

Having been barred from releasing an album since 2007 the duo had enough. When they were shortlisted for the Oz Artist of the Year Awards the duo chose to vent their frustrations on their official Facebook page with a message that said: "Despite our record label not allowing us to release music this year, we are still nominated in the top 50 for "Oz artist of the year" awards!. They concluded the post with, "HELP US shove it in their faces, and please VOTE at the link below!!" Lisa and Jessica eventually hired a lawyer in a bid to get out of their contractual obligations with the label and were successful, so by 2013 The Veronicas became an independent act. Releasing a statement which described the struggles experienced with Warner, they said, "After 5 years of being in a 'Warner Brothers Records Lockdown', we are officially able to move forward RELEASING and Recording music without our past label dictating our creative journey, or withholding our musical releases + touring." By April 2014, The Veronicas had signed with Sony Music and continued working on their third studio album.

== Recording and composition ==
The Veronicas had finished work on their third album in July 2014 and were in the process of filming a music video for another track when they decided to have a late night songwriting session. Wanting to create one more song for the record, they got together with Sydney based production duo Anthony Egizii and David Musumeci of DNA and finished the track at 1:30am. The recording session resulted in the song "You Ruin Me", which was inspired by ex-boyfriends and the dramas they experienced with their former record label. Having not released a ballad before, the duo wanted to release something unexpected. Speaking to Kathy McCabe of The Courier-Mail, Jessica Origliasso said: "We are in such a great place now as far as being artists and being comfortable as women and this song was the last piece of the puzzle to say goodbye to the broken parts of ourselves." "You Ruin Me" was recorded at Sony Studios in Sydney, New South Wales with David Pritchard-Blunt playing the piano and arranging the strings. Mixing was done by Egizii, and engineered by Louise Wheatley and Peter Holz.

"You Ruin Me" is a slow-tempo ballad. The track is written in the key of F major, with Jessica and Lisa's vocals spanning from G3 - B♭_{4}. The recording features "minimalist" instrumentation of piano and sweeping strings, an arrangement which Tim Byron of The Vine said was reminiscent of "Someone Like You" by Adele. Lisa sings most of the song, with Jessica singing the bridge and backing vocals during the last chorus. It begins with the line, "Job well done, standing ovation. You got what you wanted, I guess you won." Following the first verse, Lisa sings the chorus with, "[cause you] play me like a symphony, play me till your fingers bleed, I'm your greatest masterpiece - You ruin me."

== Release and reception ==
The song was sent to mainstream radio on 11 September 2014 and was released digitally and physically on 19 September 2014. The CD single contained a remix of the song by Josh Katz.

=== Critical response ===
"You Ruin Me" received mixed reviews from critics who praised the recording for its raw honesty, but criticised DNA Songs "generic" production of the song. Cameron Adams of the Herald Sun opined that "the raw, palpable honesty in 'You Ruin Me' reminds you the Origliasso twins have that rare ability to connect." A reviewer from mX called the song "immaculate". They suggested that the rest of The Veronicas should have been in the same vein as this "You Ruin Me", along with other album tracks "Line of Fire" and "Let Me Out". In his review of "You Ruin Me" James d'Apice of TheMusic described it as "a clumsy, melodramatic Enrique Iglesias tribute." The Vine's Tim Byron gave a lengthy review of the recording, and criticised DNA Songs production saying, "'You Ruin Me' sounds little like the radio-friendly plastic blandness of DNA Songs' previous chart toppers." Concluding his critique he said "... I listen to the song and long for it to do something clever or risky. For the person listening to pop music in the hope of hearing something interesting, there's not much here. It's slightly too obvious to my ears that 'You Ruin Me' is just bits and pieces of other people's songs put together in a new order... Of course, I've more or less said the same thing about every DNA Songs production..." By contrast, a critic from auspOp considered "You Ruin Me" to be "the least generic song Sydney production duo DNA has produced in a while." The track was named "one of the best ballads of the year" and was picked, along with "Cruel" and "Cold", as one of the top songs to download from the album.

=== Commercial performance ===
In Oceania, "You Ruin Me" debuted atop the Australian Singles Chart, becoming The Veronicas' second number-one hit in Australia since "Hook Me Up" in 2007. The recording replaced Meghan Trainor's "All About That Bass", which spent four weeks at the apex of the chart. The recording is the third to debut at the top of the chart in 2014, and The Veronicas are the fourth Australian act to gain a number-one for the year. The CD single contributed to the song's success, with over 2000 sales in its first week, out-selling the 200 copies of Trainor's EP Title. "You Ruin Me" was certified triple platinum by the Australian Recording Industry Association for shipments exceeding 210,000 copies. In New Zealand, "You Ruin Me" debuted at number 23 on the New Zealand Singles Chart and has since peaked at number 16. In Europe, "You Ruin Me" debuted at number-eight on the UK Singles Chart on 22 November where it peaked. The song is their second UK top ten hit, their first being "Untouched" which also peaked at number-eight in 2009. It also peaked at number ten in Scotland and 93 in Ireland.

=== Accolades ===
In his list of best songs of 2014, Cameron Adams of news.com.au placed "You Ruin Me" at number five commenting that, "sometimes the best songs are the most unexpected." Australian media monitor AirCheck listed the recording as the 97th most played track on Australian radio with a total of 5793 spins. The music video ranked at number 23 on rage's Best Videos of 2014 countdown. The track received a nomination for Music Video of the Year at the 6th annual Australian Rolling Stone Awards. "You Ruin Me" received a nomination for Song of the Year at the 2015 APRA Awards. At the ARIA Music Awards of 2015 the recording received nominations for Song of the Year and Best Video, winning the latter.

== Music video ==
The music video for "You Ruin Me" was filmed in Sydney and Los Angeles during September 2014 and published on VEVO on 18 September. Directed by Matt Sharp and Tapehead, the visuals are inspired by Darren Aronofsky's 2010 film Black Swan. Speaking of the concept to Stephanie Anderson of BuzzFeed, Jessica Origliasso explains that it was her idea to have a ballet inspired video saying, "I was listening to it, like a total dork, on the plane, we'd literally just recorded it, so I only had a voice note of the playback, and I took the earphones out and I was like 'Lis! I've got the concept for the video!' And it was the ballet thing." The scenes that were shot in Sydney took place at the State Theatre and Bangarra Dance Theatre. "You Ruin Me" starred two of Australia's leading Dancers Kahlia Greksa and Karinna Greksa.

== Live performances ==
In Australia, The Veronicas performed "You Ruin Me" on live television for the first time on The X Factor (Australia) on 29 September 2014 during the live elimination show. Dressed in outfits similar to the music video, Lisa was stationed in the centre of the stage, Jessica was positioned to the right playing the piano, and an orchestra played in the background. Lisa stood on her own for most of the song until the bridge when Jessica left the piano and stood beside her in the centre. Additionally, the track was sung live on the Australian version of Dancing with the Stars, as well as breakfast television programs Sunrise and Today. The duo sang "You Ruin Me" on radio for the first time for Today Network's World Famous Rooftop on 30 October. They also performed the track when they made an appearance on Nova 100's Red Room in Melbourne. While promoting the song in New Zealand in 2014, The Veronicas played an acoustic version of "You Ruin Me" on ZM and The Edge. They also made a debut performance on american TV on VH1 Big Morning Buzz Live on March 24, 2015.

=== Cover versions ===
Australian band Little Sea covered "You Ruin Me" when they appeared on Sydney radian station 2Day FM on 30 October 2014. Unlike the original minimalist performance by The Veronicas, Little Sea's cover was accompanied by guitars and drums.

== Track listing ==
Digital download

1. "You Ruin Me" – 3:50

CD single

1. "You Ruin Me" – 3:53
2. "You Ruin Me" (Josh Katz remix) – 3:15

== Charts and certifications ==
=== Weekly charts ===
Chart (2014)	Peak position
Australia (ARIA)	1
Belgium (Ultratip Bubbling Under Flanders)	48
Ireland (IRMA)	93
New Zealand (Recorded Music NZ)	16
Scottish Singles Sales (Official Charts)	10
UK Singles (Official Charts)	8
US Adult Pop Airplay (Billboard)	34

=== Year-end charts ===
Chart (2014)	Position
Australia (ARIA)	22

=== Certifications ===
Region	Certification	Certified units/sales
Australia (ARIA)	3× Platinum	210,000^{^}
New Zealand (RMNZ)	Gold	7,500^{*}
^{*} Sales figures based on certification alone.^{^} Shipments figures based on certification alone.

== Release history ==
Country	Date	Format	Label
Australia	11 September 2014	Contemporary hit radio	Sony
Australia	19 September 2014	CD single; digital download	Sony
United Kingdom	9 November 2014	Digital download	RCA
United States	23 February 2015	Hot adult contemporary	Sony; RED

== See also ==
- List of number-one singles of 2014 (Australia)
