= Lolita (The Veronicas song) =

2012 single by the Veronicas

Single by the Veronicas
- Released: 27 July 2012
- Genre: Eurodance; techno
- Length: 3:25
- Label: Sire
- Songwriters: Lisa Origliasso; Jessica Origliasso; Toby Gad; Laura Pergolizzi
- Producer: Toby Gad

The Veronicas singles chronology
"Popular" (2008)	"Lolita" (2012)	"You Ruin Me" (2014)

"Lolita" is a song recorded by Australian duo the Veronicas, released on 27 July 2012. It was written by the Veronicas (Jessica Origliasso and Lisa Origliasso), together with Laura Pergolizzi and Toby Gad, while production was handled by Gad. The song was released as the lead single for what was meant to be their third studio album, Life on Mars. However, due to complications with their label, Sire Records, the album was shelved. They were subsequently signed to Sony Music and the album was retitled The Veronicas, but "Lolita" did not appear on the record. The song was later included on their Spotify compilation album Untouched.

"Lolita" is inspired by the Vladimir Nabokov 1955 novel of the same name and explores the themes of power play in intimate relationships between people who differ in age and sex. The track was received positively by critics who praised the dark recording. "Lolita" charted in Australia at number 23 on the ARIA Singles Chart and was certified gold. The accompanying music video for "Lolita" was directed by Spencer Susser and features Lisa and Jessica leading an army of masked individuals to attack an alien. To promote the track, the Veronicas performed on various television and radio programs in Australia.

== Background ==
In 2009, after concluding the Revenge Is Sweeter Tour for their second studio album Hook Me Up (2007), Lisa Origliasso and Jessica Origliasso, wanting to seek creativity separately, took time off from working together. In 2010, following their break, the duo began work on their third album, enlisting the help of Butch Vig, Nellee Hooper, Daniel Johns and long time collaborator Toby Gad. The Veronicas were unable to release new music due to internal changes that occurred at their record label Warner Bros. Records, however, in spite of this, they made an appearance at The Viper Room in 2011 to perform new songs for their yet untitled album. By 5 July 2012, the duo announced, through an eight-second teaser video, that the title of their new single was "Lolita". They also teased the first lines of the chorus and second verse on their Twitter account on 12 July and 21 July, respectively. Around this time it was revealed that Life on Mars was the title of their third album. Initially Life on Mars was to be released by the end of 2012, however, Warner Music pushed the date back to 2013. By October 2013, having still not released new music, Life on Mars was mysteriously shelved. They subsequently left Warner Bros. Records and signed to Sony Music where they released their third album under the new title The Veronicas in 2014. "Lolita" was not included on the final track list for the record.

== Composition ==
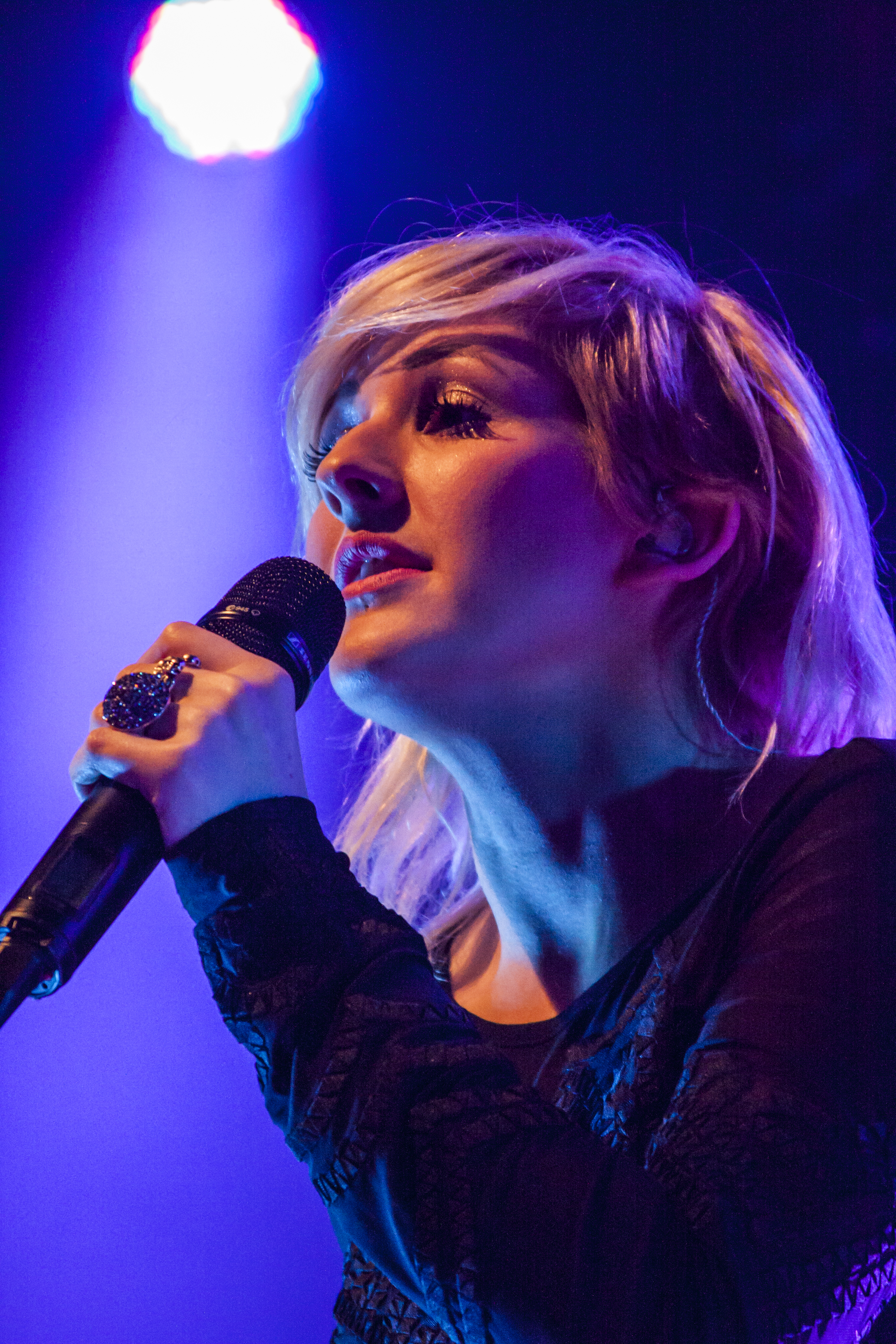
Critics noted the intro of "Lolita" is very similar to the intro of "Lights" by Ellie Goulding.

"Lolita" was co-written by Lisa Origliasso, Jessica Origliasso, Toby Gad and Laura Pergolizzi in 2010. Taking its name and inspiration from the 1955 novel of the same name by Vladimir Nabokov, the song draws on the experiences by Lisa and Jessica, of ex-boyfriends and male music executives who would try to manipulate them. In an interview with Noise11, "Lolita" was described by Lisa as, "kind of dark – it's a little bit mysterious and a little bit provoking in a sense." Explaining the theme of the song in the same interview, Jessica stated: "To us, Lolita, is about power play... It's the power play between genders and age groups, as well as people's perception of taboo, boundaries, what is acceptable and what a Lolita is: She's a bad-ass and she's on a mission. She wants to destroy something, either her own perception of what's right and wrong or everyone else's. She wants to prove something to herself."

"Lolita" is an uptempo dance-pop song with elements of rave and house music. The recording is set in common time and moves at 135 beats per minute. "Lolita" starts with an arpeggiated synth which has been noted by music critics as bearing resemblance to the intro of "Lights" by Ellie Goulding. In the chorus they sing, "I'm your Lolita, La Femme Nikita, When we're together, you'll love me forever, You're my possession, I'm your obsession, Don't tell me never, you'll love me forever." Speaking about the chorus, Becky Bain of Idolator commented that, "the name Lolita is just a euphemism for a sexy, dangerous vixen, more or less."

== Release and reception ==
"Lolita" was premiered on 2Day FM on the Kyle & Jackie O show on 26 July 2012, and the digital single and lyrics video was released the following day. The artwork features a photograph of Jessica and Lisa's mother, Colleen, in her late twenties. After coming across old photos of her, they found there was "something haunting about that particular shot". The sepia toned picture has a curved white border surrounding the edge; in the photo, Colleen is seen standing against a blank wall with both hands behind her back; her hair is parted in the centre and sits on her shoulders and her eyes are directed to her left; she is wearing a buttoned down, long sleeve pleated shirt, underneath a short black dress; the loudspeaker to her bottom-left has a torn white patch on the grille. Above the speaker are the words "The Veronicas" apexing "Lolita", written in black and red capital letters, respectively in impact font. A remix by DJ Connor Cruise was published on SoundCloud on 31 July.

"Lolita" received mostly positive reviews from critics who praised the "dark" recording and overall production and hook. PopBytes' Alex Nagorski said "It manages to not feel out of place for mainstream radio while simultaneously being completely unique and challenges the conventions of the genre." Idolator named the "big, radio-friendly single" as one of the "10 Best Songs Radio Ignored," placing it at number seven on the list. The song's production and hook was praised commenting that the "dubsteppy production, a huge hook and an appropriately grimy sound couldn't make it a hit, even if it deserved to be one." MuuMuse's Bradley Stern also praised the hook and production, giving the song four stars out of five. Overall he felt that, "It's a very natural progression from the solid, forward-thinking dark electro-pop of their 2007 record Hook Me Up. It's like a dark Ke$ha stormer–sans vomit and glitter, plus violently obsessive tendencies." Sam Lansky of MTV opined that their third album (which, at that time, was known as Life on Mars) "should continue in the vein of "Lolita" — that is, dark, melodically charged, and ingenious." Upon its release, Take 40 Australia predicted that it would "be a real party starter!" "Lolita" debuted at number 29 on the ARIA Singles Chart on 5 August 2012 and peaked at number 23, spending a total of 10 weeks on the charts. "Lolita" attained a gold certification by the Australian Recording Industry Association (ARIA), denoting 35,000 copies shipped in Australia.

== Promotion ==
=== Music video ===
The music video for "Lolita" was directed by Spencer Susser of Blue-Tongue Films and made its premiere on PerezHilton.com on 30 August 2012. The Veronicas worked on the concept with Susser, wanting to visually explore the "darker side of love through fantasy and science-fiction". Jessica commented on Susser's work, saying: "His cinematic presence brought to life the visual symbolism prevalent in our story of star-crossed love -- and the revenge that follows."

The Veronicas encountered problems with their record label, who were concerned about the public response to the concept of the video. In an interview with James Wigney of the Herald Sun, Jessica explained: "They were questioning a few things of the video content of Lolita... And someone piped up saying 'girls, what's your demographic? Do you think you might upset a few people?... I said, 'The song's called Lolita; - this is our personal lives, we are living this. We are not making this s--- up; we are writing about things that are close to home and you might want to rethink the single if you are rethinking the concept of the video'."

=== Live performances ===
The first televised performance of "Lolita" was on The X Factor (Australia) elimination show on 2 October 2012. Sung as a medley with their past hits "Untouched" and "4ever", the Veronicas performed together with the top ten contestants. The following day they performed the track on Sunrise. They also performed "Lolita" as a surprise gig on the Pepsi Next Stage Tour bus on 1 October 2012, and at the 2012 Australian Commercial Radio Awards ceremony; both events were held in Melbourne. The song has been sung acoustically on radio for Nova 96.9 with Michael Paynter playing guitar. Performed as a medley with "As Long as You Love Me" by Justin Bieber, the chorus of the track is sung instead of the bridge in "Lolita". They also performed the recording on the World Famous Rooftop in Perth for the Today Network.

== Track listing ==
Digital download

1. "Lolita" – 3:25

== Charts ==
Chart (2012)	Peak position
Australia (ARIA)	23

== Certifications ==
Region	Certification	Certified units/sales
Australia (ARIA)	Gold	35,000^{^}
^{^} Shipments figures based on certification alone.

== Release history ==
Country	Date	Format	Label
Australia	27 July 2012	Digital download	Sire Records
Canada	27 July 2012	Digital download	Sire Records
New Zealand	27 July 2012	Digital download	Sire Records
United States	27 July 2012	Digital download	Sire Records
