= The Veronicas =

Australian pop duo

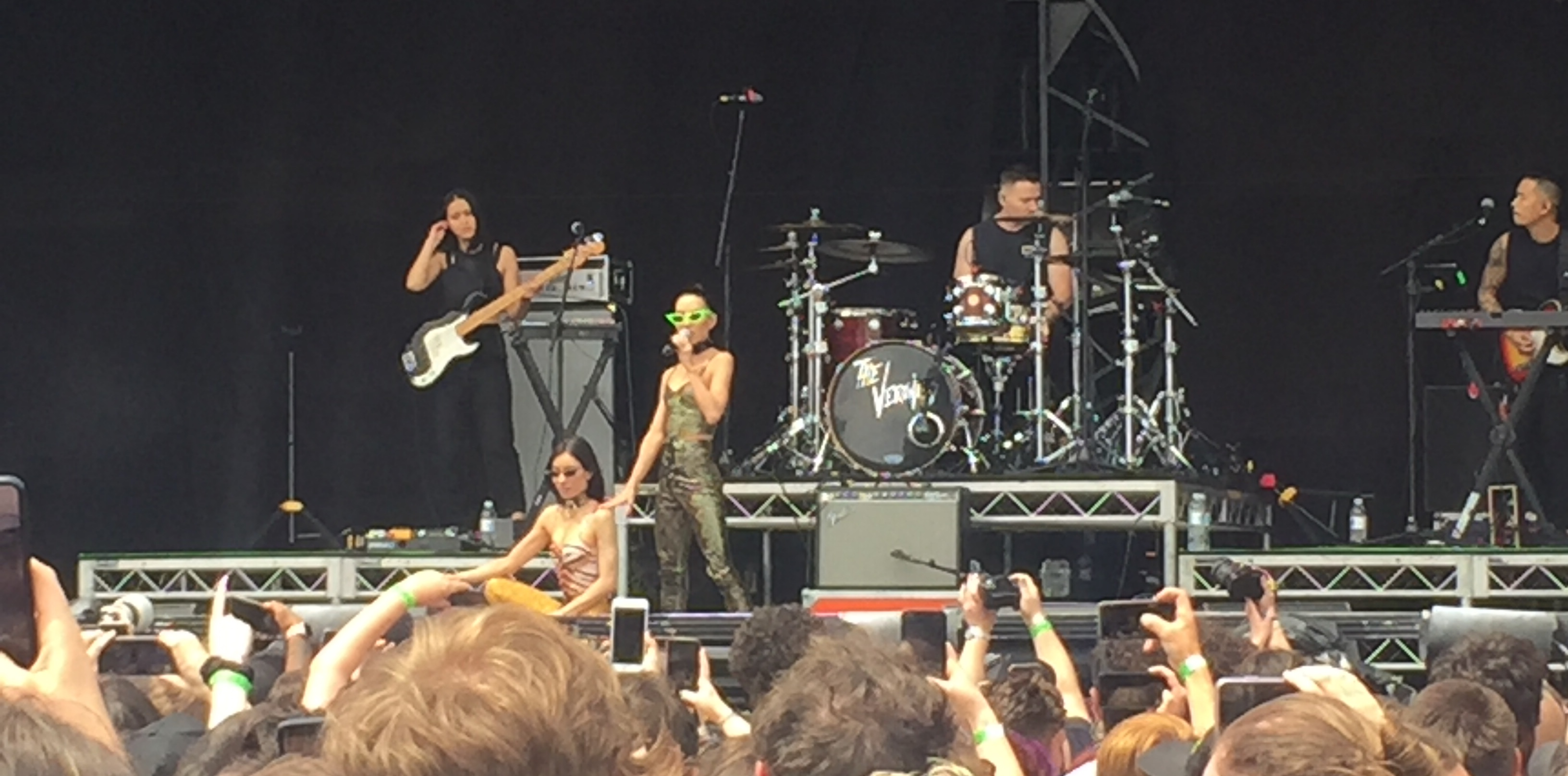
- The Veronicas in 2019

Background information
- Origin: Brisbane, Queensland, Australia
- Genres: Pop; electropop; pop rock; pop punk
- Years active: 2004–present
- Labels: Warner Bros.; Sire; Sony Music; Big Noise Music Group
- Members: Lisa Origliasso; Jessica Origliasso
- Website: theveronicas.com

The Veronicas are an Australian pop rock duo from Brisbane. The group was formed in 2004 by identical twin sisters Lisa and Jessica Origliasso.

In 2005, the Veronicas released their debut studio album, titled The Secret Life of..., which peaked at number two on the Australian Album Chart and was certified 4× platinum by Australian Recording Industry Association (ARIA) for selling over 280,000 copies. The album spawned five singles, led by "4ever", three of which were top ten singles in Australia. In 2007, the duo released their second studio album, Hook Me Up, which also peaked at number two in Australia and was certified 2× platinum for selling over 140,000 copies. The album garnered four Australian top ten singles. The album's title track, "Hook Me Up", was the Veronicas' first number one single in Australia, while "Untouched" was an international top-ten hit, especially in Sweden, where it topped the chart for seven weeks.

Following a lengthy hiatus (broken only by the July 2012 release of the Australian top-40 single "Lolita" and various gigs for their fans), in September 2014, the Veronicas released "You Ruin Me", the first single from their self-titled third studio album. The song debuted at number one on the ARIA chart, becoming the women's second chart-topping single and their first to debut in the top spot. It also charted in United States and United Kingdom. The album was released both physically and digitally on 21 November 2014. In 2016, they hosted the ARIA Music Awards. They spent most of the period between 2016 and 2021 releasing gold and platinum singles in Australia, leading to the release of both their fourth and fifth albums, Godzilla and Human, in May and June 2021, respectively.

The duo's MTV reality show The Veronicas: Blood Is for Life premiered in November 2019. In 2021 the sisters competed as contestants on the fifth season of The Celebrity Apprentice Australia. On 25 February 2020, the Veronicas released a unisex, cruelty-free fragrance named after their song "Untouched". They started their first beauty brand Lemons aimed to be "allergen free and auto-immune friendly brand" due to be released in April 2025.

In November 2022, they signed with the label Big Noise. Their sixth album Gothic Summer was released in March 2024.

== Background ==
In 2004, the sisters were introduced by Gabrielle McKinley to Robin Donald Smith. Smith was a former operatic tenor who had performed overseas with the Sadler's Wells Opera and at the Sydney Opera House with the Australian Opera, who owned the recording and music publishing company Multiplay Music Australia. After meeting Joseph and auditioning Lisa and Jessica, Multiplay Music Australia offered to sign The Twins to their first recording and music publishing agreements.

After signing the Twins, the following year Smith and Bell, funded by Multiplay Music Australia, took the Twins on several world-wide songwriting trips to Britain, Sweden, Canada and the US in order for them to collaborate with top songwriters in each country to further develop their songwriting skills. These included Clif Magness (who has written with Avril Lavigne), Billy Steinberg (Madonna, Cyndi Lauper), Max Martin (Britney Spears, Katy Perry, P!nk), Eric Nova, Dead Mono and Vince DeGiorgio, where they created a catalogue of over 50 songs.

Multiplay also secured introductions and auditions for them with numerous recording companies, including Sony, EMI, Universal, BMG, and Warner Music.

On their return to Australia, Smith and Bell met with the executives at Engine Room (a subsidiary of PBL (Packer) Group). Throughout the year Multiplay then negotiated with Engine Room to contract the Twins to secure a recording contract with Warner Music.

Meetings were then arranged with Sire Records in the US. Seymour Stein and senior executives recognised that Smith and Bell had discovered and developed a musical talent, signing them quickly to a recording contract with the label, for a reported sum of two million dollars.

=== Band name ===
Regarding how they chose their name, Jess Origliasso stated: "The name is something we thought about for a short time and we wanted it to be a girl's name, but we didn't want it to be 'the Jesses.' We were very conscious of not wanting to make it a twin thing, because we don't think that's really cool."

"We didn't want it to be called 'the Lisas,' either," singer Lisa Origliasso added. "So one day we saw the movie Heathers, and there's a line where Christian Slater asks, 'Are you a Heather?' and Winona Ryder's character [Veronica] answers, 'No, I'm a Veronica,' and so we went with that, because she was this kind of cool, unique chick with an attitude."

==== Relationship with Archie Comics ====
The cover of Veronica#167 by Archie Comics, featuring the Veronicas, Veronica Lodge and Archie Andrews

When it learned about the group, Archie Comics launched legal action against them for trademark infringement in relation to popular character Veronica Lodge – who is also known for being a female character with an attitude – in an attempt to stop them from using the name. Archie Comics had asked Warner Music Group to hand over all publicity rights and to pay US$200 million in damages. Of this amount, $20 million was for damages and $180 million as a penalty against Warner. In a statement with The New York Times Michael I. Silberkleit, chairman of Archie Comics Publications, Inc. stated,

The importance is the image of Archie, which everybody knows is good, clean, wholesome stuff ... Preventing unauthorized use of the name will protect both the characters and customers who have paid for licensing rights[...]

A settlement was reached that included a cross-promotion deal, including an appearance in an issue of Veronica's series. The issue (Veronica #167, released on 1 March 2006) featured the Veronicas in the feature story, What's in a Name?, in which they meet Lodge, perform in Riverdale and spend a day there, as well as a card with a code allowing a free download of their single "4ever" in MP3 form. A few months later, Archie and Friends (No. 100) featured the Archies meeting the Veronicas. The next issue of Archie and Friends (No. 101) also featured the Veronicas, with Archie as their biggest fan.

== Music career ==
=== 2005–2006: The Secret Life of... ===
The Veronicas performed at the 2005 NRL Grand Final days before their debut album, titled The Secret Life of..., was released in Australia on 17 October 2005, entering the ARIA Album chart at No. 7. Since then, it has peaked at No. 2 and gone 4× Platinum. Due to the success of the album, five singles were released in Australia: "4ever", "Everything I'm Not", "When It All Falls Apart", "Revolution" and "Leave Me Alone".

The Secret Life of the Veronicas spent a year on the ARIA album chart without leaving the Top 40. In September 2006, the album was nominated for three ARIA awards including; "Best Pop Release", "Highest Selling Album" and "Best Breakthrough Album". They won "Best Pop Release" but lost the other two to other nominees. The girls also performed their second single "Everything I'm Not" on the night.

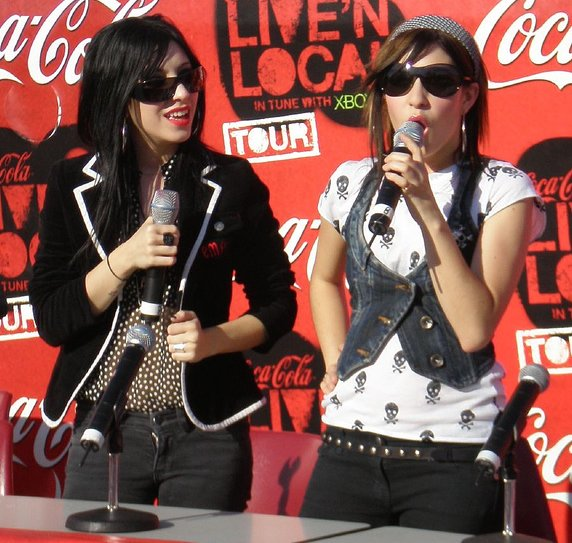
The Veronicas in October 2006

The album was released in the US on 14 February 2006; it debuted at No. 133 on Billboard 200 and No. 3 on the Billboard Top Heatseekers chart. Only two singles were released in the United States off the album. A special DVD was released with the US version as a limited edition exclusive. The limited edition included two extra songs and videos, and was only available online. However, copies have been found to have been shipped to several stores in Australia as well. Other releases in the US include Sessions@AOL which features their songs "Heavily Broken" and "Revolution" live in the AOL studios, also released was The Veronicas: Mtv.com Live EP which also features live performances of their songs including a new song, titled "Stay".

The album has also had success in other countries such as New Zealand where it debuted at No. 5, No. 75 on the Dutch Album Chart and No. 11 in Belgium. Due to their chart success in Belgium, they won the award for Best International New Artist at the TMF Awards of 2006. "When It All Falls Apart" spent a record of 17 weeks of MTV Asia's Pop 10 Chart, in which 7 of them were at the number 1 spot. The song was recorded in Simlish and is featured in the Sims 2 expansion pack Seasons.

Lisa and Jessica are the faces of Choice Calvin Klein and Australian hair product company nu:u. Blender magazine included them in their list of hottest women in rock in 2006. The sisters sang the title song on the short-lived television show Related which had featured songs from their debut album. They appeared in an episode that aired 6 February 2006. In March 2006, their debut single "4ever" was featured in the Amanda Bynes comedy She's the Man. It was featured in the promotional television spots, the film itself and the soundtrack. Their song "Revolution" appeared in another Amanda Bynes film, Sydney White, in 2007.

The girls also appeared on The Suite Life of Zack & Cody episode "The Suite Life Goes Hollywood" as guest stars and performed their song "Cry". The twins have also created a fashion line called "The Veronicas for Target" which was released in stores on 25 August 2007 in Australia.

On 2 December 2006, The Veronicas released a CD/DVD, titled Exposed... the Secret Life of The Veronicas in Australia which features live performances from their Australian 2006 Revolution Tour and a DVD featuring parts of the sisters' live performances throughout 2005–2006, including footage that had previously not been seen, and their music videos. The album debuted at No. 6 on the ARIA DVD Charts accrediting platinum in its first week. The second week it rose to its peak of No. 3 and was accredited Double Platinum.

=== 2007–2009: Hook Me Up and worldwide expansion ===
In early 2007, The Veronicas began work on their second album. The album was written and recorded in Los Angeles, California, with Toby Gad, Billy Steinberg, Greg Wells, Shelly Peiken and John Feldmann.

Hook Me Up was released in Australia on 3 November 2007. The album debuted at number two on the Australian ARIA Albums Chart with sales of 9,531 copies in its first week, and was certified Gold. It has since gone 2× platinum. The album became the twenty-eighth-highest selling album in Australia for 2007. Hook Me Up was released in the UK on 12 October 2009 and has peaked at number thirty-five.

The lead single from the album, "Hook Me Up", was added to Australian radio on 27 August 2007, but was physically released on 22 September 2007. It debuted at number five, eventually reaching number one after seven weeks on the ARIA Singles Chart, making it their first number one hit in Australia.

The Veronicas in concert during their Revenge Is Sweeter tour in Melbourne

"Untouched" was the first single to be released from their album in the United States, Canada, Europe and New Zealand. The song reached number 2 in Australia, eventually reaching platinum accreditation. The song became their first single to chart on the Billboard Hot 100 debuting at number sixty-two and eventually peaking at number seventeen making it their first top twenty hit in the United States. They became the first Australian artists to have a single certified Platinum in the U.S. with over 1,000,000 paid downloads. It was also their debut single in the UK, peaking at number eight and in Ireland peaking at number one, their first international number-one single

Their third and fourth singles, "This Love" and "Take Me on the Floor", were both top ten hits in Australia and were both certified Gold. "Take Me on the Floor" was released as their second single in the U.S. but only peaked at number eighty-one. On 11 October, their fifth single, "Popular", was released digitally in Australia. It has only gained heavy airplay and peaked at No. 11 on the Australian Airplay Chart.

Their debut single "4ever" was re-released as their second single in the UK and Ireland on 21 September 2009 and has peaked at number 17 in the UK and twenty in Ireland.

In support of the album, The Veronicas embarked on their third Australian tour, The Hook Me Up Tour, in 2007. The tour, which began on 30 November and concluded on 12 December, was held in eight major cities around Australia.

On 16 October 2008, The Veronicas announced their second tour for the album, Revenge Is Sweeter tour, which was their first tour to extend into New Zealand, United States, Canada, UK and Japan beginning on 13 February 2009 in Newcastle, Australia and ending on 25 September 2009 in Manchester, UK as well as a European promotional tour which included France, Germany and Italy. As part of their tour in Japan they released a two disc compilation album called The Veronicas Complete featuring all their songs from their first and second albums as well as three bonus tracks on 18 March 2009. In September 2008, the nominees for the 22nd annual ARIA Awards were announced, with The Veronicas receiving four nominations. Hook Me Up received two nominations for Best Pop Release and Highest Selling Album and "Untouched" and Hook Me Up (single) received a nomination for Highest Selling Single each. The Veronicas performed their hit single "Untouched" at the event, but left with no awards.

"Untouched" was featured in the popular videogame FIFA 09.

=== 2010–2013: Musical experimentation, secret gigs and split from Warner Music ===
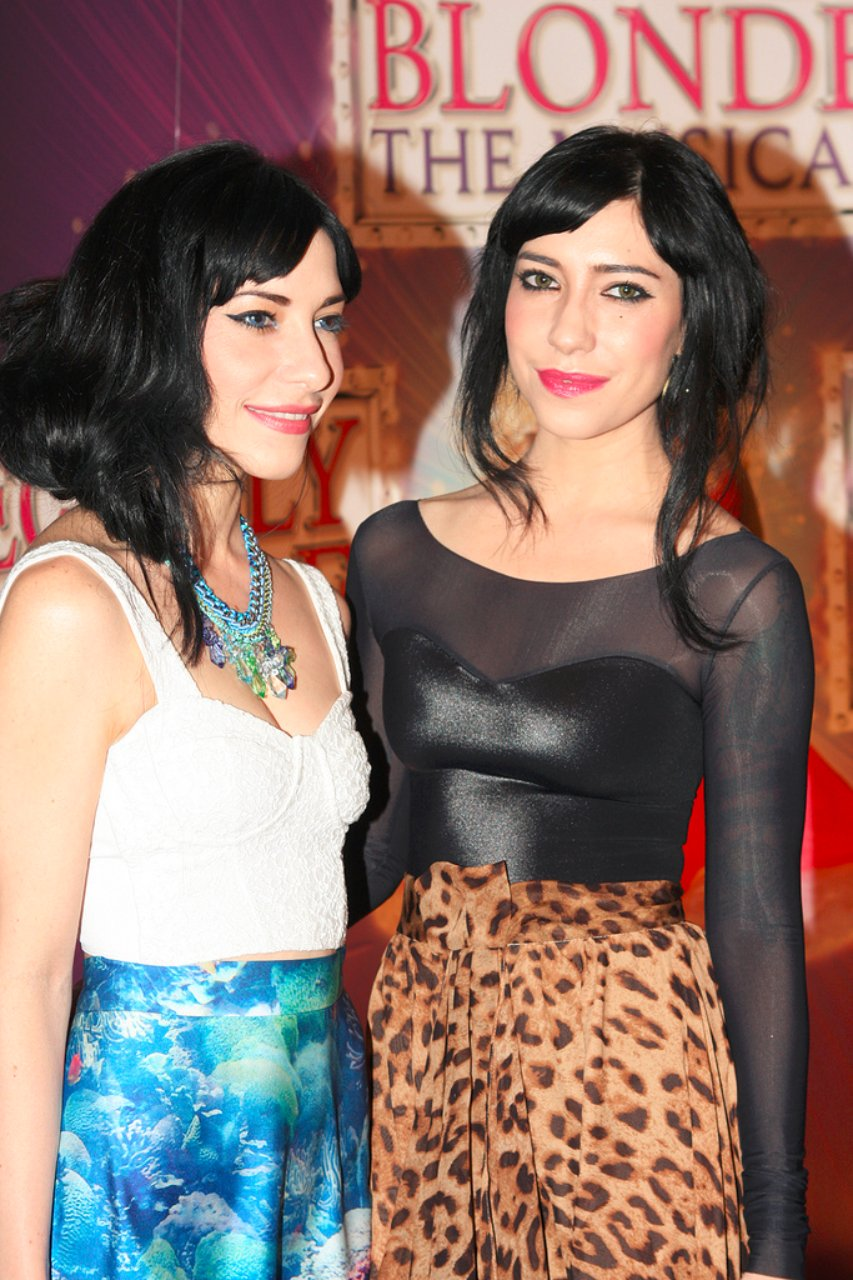
The Veronicas in 2012

Writing for their third studio album had begun in December 2009, and recording began in January 2010. The album, which cites influences by classical music, classical rock and pop genres, would have been their first release in over three years. Jessica Origliasso stated that the album was to be inspired by artists The Subways, The Dead Weather, Mazzy Star, Ladytron and Peaches. Lisa and Jessica Origliasso described the album as "[...] a little different from [...] the last two records" and "[...] a pop record [with] different undertones." During this period they sampled 10 different songs live and a few covers for the fans.

Lending their vocals elsewhere, Lisa and Jessica also collaborated with Michael Paynter to record a song called "Love the Fall" for his homonymous EP. The song peaked at number nineteen on the ARIA chart. They also revealed in February 2011 that they had recorded backing vocals for Cherie Currie's new album. Additionally The Veronicas recorded a cover version of the song "Grown-Up Christmas List", by singer Amy Grant, for the Christmas compilation album The Spirit of Christmas 2010.

Lisa also started a group called the Dead Cool Dropouts with her friend Tyler Bryant, mostly done using GarageBand on Mac. They have released an EP of songs, these songs are called: "Write You Off", "Green Eyes Make Me Blue", "Blame It On Me", "Shallow", "Playing For Keeps", "Ju Ju Ya Ya" and "Criminal Heart". In 2013 on Instagram Tyler Bryant and Lisa Veronica revealed that they were both in the studio working on some new music.

In February 2012, it was announced that a release date for the album was "coming soon". LOM was tagged on their Twitter feeds as an important phrase on 15 May 2012. They also indicated the album was due for release in late 2012. On 2 June 2012, The Veronicas revealed the name of the album to be Life On Mars (Working title was; 'The Awakening' and they played with various titles like Death On Mars and Skeleton), and that it was to be released in September or October 2012. Warner Music then delayed the release of the album until 2013, as stated by the Daily Telegraph on 2 September.

The first single off the then-promised album was titled "Lolita". The lyric video was released on 27 July 2012 and the official music video was released on 30 August.

The Veronicas co-wrote and recorded backing vocals for a song called "Back to Life" which is included on EP 16 & Unstoppable by Christina Parie who finished 6th on third season The X Factor Australia.

Due to label conflicts, The Veronicas embarked on a process of making many changes to the album. The release date was postponed, and the content and theme of the album was changed. The girls also explained that "Lolita" was not an official single promoting the new album "It was just a single release for our Australian fans, as it's been such a long time since we have had anything new over there".

On 26 October 2013, The Veronicas announced via their official Facebook page that they had split from Sire Records.

=== 2014–2015: The Veronicas, record deal with Sony Music Entertainment ===
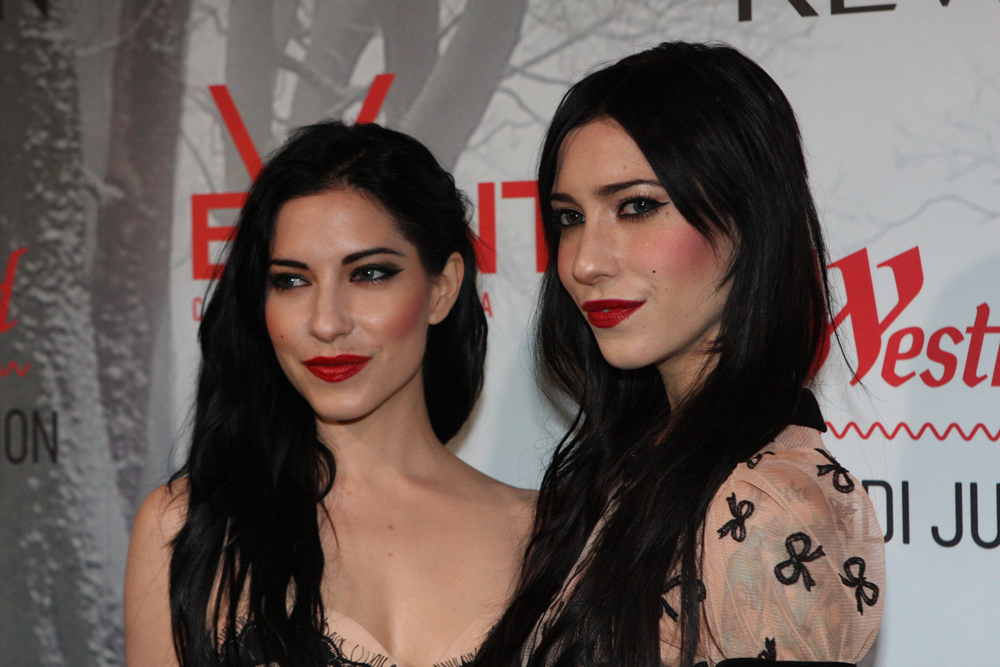
The Veronicas in 2012

In March 2014, The Veronicas started a reality webseries titled Did You Miss Me?. It was later announced that a record deal had been struck with Sony Music Entertainment, and the long anticipated third album was set to be released late in 2014.

On 5 September 2014 The Veronicas announced the lead single for their third album, titled "You Ruin Me", which was released on 19 September 2014. The song premiered on Australian radio on 11 September 2014. On 27 September, the song debuted at number one on the ARIA Single Charts. It is The Veronicas' second number one single after "Hook Me Up" in 2007.

On 21 October, The Veronicas held a private showcase of their upcoming album for fans. The girls confirmed a number of tracks would be on the album, including "Cold", "Did You Miss Me?", "Mad Love" and "Sanctified". They also stated that future shows will be more intimate, "very theatrical" and interactive. On 31 October, during a special album release secret show, song "If You Love Someone" was announced as a second single. The song was premiered on Australian radios on Wednesday 5 November, and was released alongside the launch of The Veronicas on 21 November. The song became a success in Australia, peaking at number 5 and was certified gold. "Cruel" was released as the third single from the album.

The Veronicas were the opening act for the Australian pop punk band, 5 Seconds Of Summer, on the pre-tour for the band's 2015 Rock Out With Your Socks Out Tour. In January 2015, The Veronicas announced that their Sanctified Tour would extend to the UK in March, with five shows across the country. They also did a promo tour around both Europe and America.

=== 2016–2022: Television work, Godzilla and Human ===
On 19 June 2016, it was announced that The Veronicas would briefly replace The Madden Brothers as coaches on The Voice Australia. During an interview with NewsLimited, the duo stated "Any opportunity where we get to interact with and supporting other artists in any way is exciting for us". This was related to their single "In My Blood".

Their single's music video "On Your Side" premiered on 17 November 2016, the video is written, directed and starred by actress and model Ruby Rose. The pair hosted the ARIA Music Awards of 2016, providing a topless performance of "In My Blood". Social media users gave mixed responses during the night but there was praise for The Veronicas going topless on national television. The Veronicas performed at the Sydney Gay and Lesbian Mardi Gras after party on 4 March.

On 31 May 2017, the Veronicas announced the release of the third single, "The Only High", from their upcoming album which was originally scheduled to be released in June 2017, but was announced on 13 November 2017 that they would not release any new material until 2018. On 15 April 2018, The Veronica's performed "Can't Get You Out of My Head" at the 2018 Commonwealth Games closing ceremony. They released another new single, "Think of Me", in March 2019.

The pair planned to release their next single, "Life of the Party" featuring Australian rapper Allday, in July 2019, although this did not occur. In October 2019, it was confirmed the duo's reality show, titled The Veronicas: Blood Is for Life, which premiered on MTV on 10 November 2019. To go along with the reality show the duo released "Ugly" the song which also serves as the theme song as well as where the title comes from.

The Veronicas appeared at Good Things Festival 2019. At their Melbourne date, the duo was preceded by a Facebook event titled "Wall of death when The Veronica's play Untouched at Good Things".

In June 2020 the Sydney Morning Herald reported that The Veronicas were to fill as guest mentors for the ninth season of The Voice Australia coach Boy George, who would be mentoring his acts remotely from the UK because of travel restrictions in place due to the COVID-19 pandemic. The same month, their studio album Human was announced for release.

On 26 March 2021, The Veronicas released the song "Godzilla", which was included on the album of the same name, released on 28 May 2021, which was followed by Human on 25 June 2021. They toured the albums 2021 and 2022 They left Sony Music in 2022 In September 2022 they released separate solo projects, Jessica's called "Seeing Stars" and Lisa's called "Cruisin' On My Own". The Veronicas eventually signed with Big Noise in the US for future releases. They released their first fragrance in 2020, called Untouched.

=== 2023–present: Gothic Summer ===
The duo announced their then upcoming sixth album Gothic Summer in October 2023, and released the single "Perfect" on 20 October. They released "Detox" in December 2023 and announced a tour in 2024 They are opening Cyndi Lauper in 2025 in Australia. They started their first beauty brand Lemons aimed to be "allegen free and autoimmune-friendly brand" due to be released in April 2025.

In July 2025, two of the duo's songs were included in the Triple J Hottest 100 of Australian songs: "4ever" was listed at number 76, while "Untouched" was listed at number 3.

== Activism ==
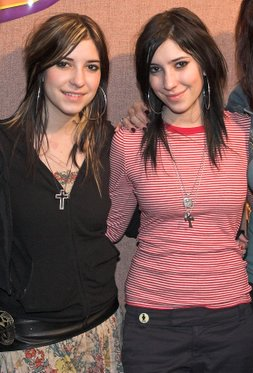
The Veronicas in November 2005

In 2006, the Veronicas joined Steve Irwin's Wildlife Warriors Worldwide, a charity that deals with the protection of animals and their natural environments. Their work for the charity included a campaign to reach 2,000 text messages in the hopes of raising A$1,000. In 2010 Lisa and Jessica were honoured as Wildlife Warriors of the year for their efforts in publicizing animal protection and conservation on a worldwide scale. The Veronicas also advocate for Sea Shepherd.

The band was featured in Australian Music in Tune, a "botched publicity campaign" against music piracy, along with Powderfinger, Jimmy Barnes and Silverchair.

In January 2009, Jess posed nude for a PETA advertisement after a member of the organization spotted her wearing a jacket reading "fuck fur".

Lisa marched alongside Drew Barrymore, Pete Wentz, Janice Dickinson and other celebrities in support of same-sex marriage in California at a May 2009 march in Los Angeles, protesting the California Supreme Court ruling upholding Proposition 8. In Australia, both twins joined a "Wear it with Pride" campaign to reform legal discrimination against same-sex couples and their families. The campaign involved them wearing numbered T-shirts representing 85 legislative changes enacted to reduce discrimination. They also spoke up against the forced closures of Aboriginal communities in Australia.

== Products and endorsements ==
The Veronicas range of endorsements have included Australian hair products Nu:U and were also chosen to be the faces of the autumn 2005 promotional campaign for Choice Calvin Klein range. In 2006 they entered into a co-marketing deal with shoe brand Keds for their first US tour. The deal included web promotions and in-store acoustic performances at selected stores. On 27 January 2010 they announced via Twitter that they had signed a deal with cosmetic brand Flirt!, a division of Estée Lauder, to be the faces of their "Rock-n-Rebel" perfume. They became ambassadors for the fragrance with the deal to including a multi-million dollar promotion during mid-2010 which also included giving make-up tips via the Rock-n-Rebel website and judged a beauty contest where young women were asked to submit photos of their "ultimate rock star style".

On 25 August 2007, the Veronicas launched their self-titled fashion line at Target Miranda store and is available in stores around Australia. According to the girls the fashion line was created to reflect their style which had been sought after by their younger fans and what they would like to see younger girls wear. Aimed at seven- to fourteen-year-old girls Lisa described the fashion line as "punk princess, mixed with rock 'n' roll," and Jess described it as "princess and cute." The colours used for their fashion line include black and white and also features cherries, pirate motifs and love heart details. The current clothing range includes day-wear and pyjamas.

On 25 February 2020, the Veronicas released a unisex, cruelty-free fragrance named after their song "Untouched". The fragrance was available for pre-order exclusively through Chemist Warehouse. In 2025, they launched their beauty brand Lemons which aims to provide allergen-free and autoimmune friendly makeups.

== Discography ==
Studio albums

- The Secret Life of... (2005)
- Hook Me Up (2007)
- The Veronicas (2014)
- Godzilla (2021)
- Human (2021)
- Gothic Summer (2024)

== Tours ==
Headlining

- Revolution Tour (2006)
- Hook Me Up Tour (2007)
- Revenge Is Sweeter Tour (2009)
- Pre Third Album Tour (2011–2012)
- Sanctified Tour (2015)
- Godzilla V Human Tour (2021–2022)
- Gothic Summer Tour (2024-)

Opening act

- Rock Out with Your Socks Out Tour (for 5 Seconds of Summer; 2014)
- Girls Just Wanna Have Fun Farewell Tour (for Cyndi Lauper; 2025)

Guest performance

- Half Way to the Top tour with Cool Boys and the Frontman (2016)
