= Toby Gad discography =

This is the discography for German music producer Toby Gad. The table below includes songs that he has either or both written/produced for other people.

Year	Artist	Song	Album
1986	Crystale	"Love Attack"	Non-album single
1986	Crystale	"And You?"	B-side to "Love Attack"
1988	Milli Vanilli	"Can't You Feel My Love"	All or Nothing
1988	Milli Vanilli	"Boy in the Tree"	All or Nothing
1988	Milli Vanilli	"Is It Love"	All or Nothing
1990	Q	"Moving Sensitive"	NRG
1990	Q	"Is It Love"	NRG
1990	Q	"The Beast in Me"	NRG
1990	Q	"Rainy Day"	NRG
1990	Q	"Don't Pull Me Down"	NRG
1990	Q	"Boy in the Tree"	NRG
1990	Q	"Jealousy"	NRG
1990	Q	"Girlfriend"	NRG
1990	Q	"Consciousness"	NRG
1990	Q	"Supervize Me"	NRG
1992	Nemorin	"Accilelao"	Creole Dance
1992	Nemorin	"Creole Dance"	Creole Dance
1992	Nemorin	"Aloha Mahe"	Creole Dance
1992	Nemorin	"Bajo"	Creole Dance
1992	Nemorin	"Tale About Freedom"	Creole Dance
1992	Nemorin	"It Feels Good to Be Loved"	Creole Dance
1992	Nemorin	"Around the World"	Creole Dance
1992	Nemorin	"Blood of the Kings"	Creole Dance
1992	Nemorin	"Merry Go Round"	Creole Dance
1994	Nemorin	"Mission of Love"	Mission of Love, also appeared on The NeverEnding Story III OST
1994	Nemorin	"Dream On (The Neverending Story)"	The NeverEnding Story III OST, also appeared on Mission of Love
1995	Love You	"Countdown to the Summer"	Non-album single
1995	Love You	"The Magic of the Fall"	Non-album single
1995	Nemorin	"Aloha Wahine"	Mission of Love
1995	Nemorin	"Boat on the River"	Mission of Love
1995	Nemorin	"Angelina"	Mission of Love
1995	Nemorin	"Fire of Love"	Mission of Love
1995	Nemorin	"Why?"	Mission of Love
1995	Nemorin	"Shine On"	Mission of Love
1995	Nemorin	"Le Le Kasbah"	Mission of Love
1995	Nemorin	"What If?"	Mission of Love
1995	Nemorin	"For the Children"	Mission of Love
1996	Love You	"Follow the Call of Love"	Non-album single
1997	Love You	"Today is Your Lucky Day"	Non-album single, appeared on the compilation Rock'n'Future
1998	Chicadee	"Ooh La La"	Non-album single
1998	Mascara	"Charly"	Non-album single
1998	Ruth Jacott	"Carmenchita"	Vals Verlangen
1999	R&B	"Be My Girl"	Hot Dogs-Wau-Weir Sind Reich!
1999	Innosense	"This Must Be Love"	Hot Dogs-Wau-Weir Sind Reich!
1999	Tami Davis	"1000 Butterflies"	Hot Dogs-Wau-Weir Sind Reich!
1999	19 KJ	"Daffy Little Symphony" feat. M Keller	Hot Dogs-Wau-Weir Sind Reich!
1999	Qute	"Free as a Bird"	Hot Dogs-Wau-Weir Sind Reich!
1999	19 KJ	"Die Verruckte Kleine Symphonie" feat. Sandrina	Hot Dogs-Wau-Weir Sind Reich!
1999	Jane Bogaert	"Traume Werden Manchmal Wahr"	Hot Dogs-Wau-Weir Sind Reich!
1999	Scatman John	"The Chickadee Song"	Take Your Time
1999	Oli.P	"Show Me Love"	O.Ton
2000	Nino de Angelo	"Quanto"	Schwindelfrei
2000	Justine	"You're My Sunshine"	Non-album single
2001	PYT	"Simple Things"	Down with Me
2001	K-Otic	"Damn (I Think I Love You)"	Bulletproof
2001	K-Otic	"Rebel Child"	Bulletproof
2001	Sita	"Happy"	Happy
2002	Norissa	"Never Too Late"	Non-album single
2003	Naturally 7	"No Fool for You"	What Is It
2003	Willa Ford	"A Toast to Men" feat. Lady May	Non-album single
2004	Sandy Mölling	"One in a Million"	Unexpected
2004	Aneta Langerová	"Srdcotepec"	Spousta Andelu
2005	Fatty Koo	"Shake"	House of Fatty Koo
2005	Fatty Koo	"Bounce"	House of Fatty Koo
2005	Fatty Koo	"Fatty Koo"	House of Fatty Koo
2005	Fatty Koo	"Chills"	House of Fatty Koo
2005	Fatty Koo	"I Like That Girl"	House of Fatty Koo
2005	Fatty Koo	"Lust"	House of Fatty Koo
2005	Fatty Koo	"Princess Un Disguise"	House of Fatty Koo
2005	Fatty Koo	"H.O.F.K."	House of Fatty Koo
2005	Fatty Koo	"Cruis Control"	House of Fatty Koo
2005	Fatty Koo	"G'On Girl"	House of Fatty Koo
2005	Fatty Koo	"Tight"	House of Fatty Koo
2005	Fatty Koo	"Juke Joint"	House of Fatty Koo
2005	Fatty Koo	"Move On"	House of Fatty Koo
2005	Fatty Koo	"Drive Me Crazy"	House of Fatty Koo
2005	Kaci Brown	"Unbelievable"	Instigator
2005	Kaci Brown	"Instigator"	Instigator
2005	Kaci Brown	"Cadillac Hotel"	Instigator
2005	Kaci Brown	"Body Language"	Instigator
2005	Kaci Brown	"The Waltz"	Instigator
2005	Kaci Brown	"SOS"	Instigator
2005	Kaci Brown	"Like Em Like That"	Instigator
2005	Kaci Brown	"My Baby"	Instigator
2005	Kaci Brown	"You Fool"	Instigator
2005	Kaci Brown	"Make You Love Me"	Instigator
2005	Kaci Brown	"Thank You"	Instigator
2005	Ricky Martin	"Drop It on Me" feat. Daddy Yankee	Life
2005	The Veronicas	"Secret"	The Secret Life Of...
2005	The Veronicas	"Mouth Shut"	The Secret Life Of...
2005	The Veronicas	"Speechless"	The Secret Life Of...
2005	Lola	"No Strings"	Non-album single
2005	Kaci Brown	"O Holy Night"	Non-album single, appeared on the compilation Sweet Tracks 2005
2006	Jane Zhang	"To Be Loved"	Jane, Love EP
2006	Fergie	"Big Girls Don't Cry"	The Dutchess
2007	Elisabeth Withers	"Simple Things"	It Can Happen to Anyone
2007	Elisabeth Withers	"Heartstrings"	It Can Happen to Anyone
2007	Elisabeth Withers	"Listen"	It Can Happen to Anyone
2007	Elisabeth Withers	"It Can Happen"	It Can Happen to Anyone
2007	Elisabeth Withers	"Get Your Shoes On"	It Can Happen to Anyone
2007	Elisabeth Withers	"Be with You"	It Can Happen to Anyone
2007	Elisabeth Withers	"The World Ain't Ready"	It Can Happen to Anyone
2007	Elisabeth Withers	"Somebody"	It Can Happen to Anyone
2007	Elisabeth Withers	"Wind Beneath My Wings"	It Can Happen to Anyone
2007	Elisabeth Withers	"Sweat"	It Can Happen to Anyone
2007	Elisabeth Withers	"Next to You"	It Can Happen to Anyone
2007	María José	"Me Equivoque"	María José
2007	Hannah Montana	"Rock Star"	Hannah Montana 2: Meet Miley Cyrus
2007	Hannah Montana	"One in a Million"	Hannah Montana 2: Meet Miley Cyrus
2007	The Veronicas	"Untouched"	Hook Me Up
2007	Keke Palmer	"Rainbow"	So Uncool
2007	Keke Palmer	"Bottoms Up"	So Uncool
2007	Keke Palmer	"Skin Deep"	So Uncool
2007	Keke Palmer	"Wake Up All"	So Uncool
2007	The Veronicas	"This is How It Feels"	Hook Me Up
2007	The Veronicas	"This Love"	Hook Me Up
2007	The Veronicas	"Take Me on the Floor"	Hook Me Up
2007	The Veronicas	"Popular"	Hook Me Up
2007	The Veronicas	"Revenge is Sweeter (Then You Ever Were)"	Hook Me Up
2007	The Veronicas	"All I Have"	Hook Me Up
2007	The Veronicas	"In Another Life"	Hook Me Up
2007	The Veronicas	"Goodbye to You"	Hook Me Up
2008	Natasha Bedingfield	"Happy"	Pocketful of Sunshine
2008	Natasha Bedingfield	"Freckles"	Pocketful of Sunshine
2008	Donna Summer	"Fame (The Game)"	Crayons
2008	Donna Summer	"Sand on My Feet"	Crayons
2008	Donna Summer	"Science of Love"	Crayons
2008	Jordan Francis	"Hasta La Vista" with Roshon Fegan	Camp Rock OST
2008	Meaghan Martin	"Too Cool"	Camp Rock OST
2008	Beyoncé	"If I Were a Boy"	I Am... Sasha Fierce
2008	Brandy	"Human"	Human
2008	Brandy	"Gonna Find My Love"	Human
2009	Sandra	"In a Heartbeat"	In a Heartbeat EP
2009	Sandra	"These Moments"	In a Heartbeat EP
2009	Sandra	"Kiss My..."	In a Heartbeat EP
2009	BoA	"Touched"	BoA
2009	Sandra	"R U Feeling Me"	Back to Life
2009	Sandra	"Once in a Lifetime"	Back to Life
2009	Sandra	"The Night is Still Young" feat. Thomas Anders	Back to Life
2009	Sandra	"Just Like Breathing"	Back to Life
2009	Sandra	"Always on My Mind" (feat. Va Slim	Back to Life
2009	Sandra	"What If"	Back to Life
2009	Sandra	"I Want You"	Back to Life
2009	Sandra	"Who I Am"	Back to Life
2009	Esmée Denters	"Admit It"	Outta Here
2009	Ashley Tisdale	"Delete You"	Guilty Pleasure
2009	Ashley Tisdale	"Me Without You"	Guilty Pleasure
2009	Hannah Montana	"Just a Girl"	Hannah Montana 3
2009	Demi Lovato	"Everything You're Not"	Here We Go Again
2009	Jessie James	"Inevitable"	Jessie James
2009	Jordin Sparks	"Let It Rain"	Battlefield
2009	Jordin Sparks	"Emergency (911)"	Battlefield
2009	Jordin Sparks	"Faith"	Battlefield
2009	Jordin Sparks	"Papercut"	Battlefield
2009	Pixie Lott	"Band Aid"	Turn It Up
2009	Pixie Lott	"Nothing Compares"	Turn It Up
2009	Selena Gomez & the Scene	"I Don't Miss You at All"	Kiss & Tell
2009	Lisa Lois	"Too Much is Never Enough"	Smoke
2009	Kris Allen	"The Truth"	Kris Allen
2009	Kris Allen	"I Need to Know"	Kris Allen
2009	Kris Allen	"From the Ashes"	Kris Allen
2009	Jessica Jarrell	"Armageddon"	Non-album single
2009	Allison Iraheta	"Scars"	Just Like You
2009	Alicia Keys	"Love is My Disease"	The Element of Freedom
2009	Robin Thicke	"Mona Lisa"	Sex Therapy: The Experience
2010	Anna Voigt	"Thing Called Love"	Dreams Come True
2010	Monrose	"Catwalk V-O-G-U-E"	Ladylike
2010	Hannah Montana	"Ordinary Girl"	Hannah Montana Forever
2010	BoA	"Adrenaline"	Hurricane Venus
2010	Various artists	"It's On"	Camp Rock 2: The Final Jam OST
2010	Matt Finley	"Tear It Down" with Meaghan Martin	Camp Rock 2: The Final Jam OST
2010	Tarja	"I Feel Immortal"	What Lies Beneath
2010	Hannah Montana	"Are You Ready"	Hannah Montana Forever
2010	Selena Gomez & the Scene	"A Year Without Rain"	A Year Without Rain
2010	Elisabeth Withers	"Dream"	No Regrets
2010	Elisabeth Withers	"Why"	No Regrets
2010	Elisabeth Withers	"Bittersweet"	No Regrets
2010	Elisabeth Withers	"Say It Now"	No Regrets
2010	Selena Gomez & the Scene	"Intuition" feat. Eric Bellinger	A Year Without Rain
2010	Emily Osment	"Let's Be Friends"	Fight or Flight
2010	Emily Osment	"Lovesick"	Fight or Flight
2010	Pixie Lott	"Broken Arrow"	Turn It Up Louder
2010	Hannah Montana	"Que Sera"	Hannah Montana Forever
2010	Nadine Coyle	"My Sexy Love Affair"	Insatiable
2010	Nadine Coyle	"You Are the One"	Insatiable
2010	JLS	"Love You More"	Outta This World
2010	Lee DeWyze	"Live It Up"	Live It Up
2010	Lee DeWyze	"Dear Isabelle"	Live It Up
2010	Lee DeWyze	"Brooklyn Bridge"	Live It Up
2010	Lee DeWyze	"Earth Stood Still"	Live It Up
2010	Alesha Dixon	"Cool with Me"	The Entertainer
2010	Jazmine Sullivan	"Stuttering"	Love Me Back
2011	Colbie Caillat	"I Do"	All of You
2011	Jessie J	"L.O.V.E."	Who You Are
2011	Jessie J	"Who You Are"	Who You Are
2011	Nicole Scherzinger	"Don't Hold Your Breath"	Killer Love
2011	Ashley Tisdale	"Gonna Shine"	Sharpay's Fabulous Adventure OST
2011	Nick Carter	"Great Divide"	I'm Taking Off
2011	Nick Carter	"Nothing Left to Lose"	I'm Taking Off
2011	Christina Grimmie	"Ugly"	Find Me EP
2011	Selena Gomez & the Scene	"Bang Bang Bang"	When the Sun Goes Down
2011	Selena Gomez & the Scene	"We Own the Night" feat. Pixie Lott	When the Sun Goes Down
2011	Colbie Caillat	"Think Good Thoughts"	All of You
2011	Colbie Caillat	"What Means the Most"	All of You
2011	Demi Lovato	"Skyscraper"	Unbroken
2011	Victoria Justice	"All I Want is Everything"	Victorious: Music from the Hit TV Show OST
2011	Koda Kumi	"V.I.P."	4 Times EP
2011	Demi Lovato	"My Love is Like a Star"	Unbroken
2011	Demi Lovato	"For the Love of a Daughter"	Unbroken
2011	James Morrison	"Up" feat. Jessie J	The Awakening
2011	James Morrison	"Slave to the Music"	The Awakening
2011	James Morrison	"One Life"	The Awakening
2011	Kelly Clarkson	"Einstein"	Stronger
2011	Kelly Clarkson	"The War Is Over"	Stronger
2011	Cher Lloyd	"Dub on the Track" feat. Mic Righteous, Dot Rotten & Ghetts	Sticks and Stones
2011	Pixie Lott	"Dancing on My Own" feat. Marty James	Young Foolish Happy
2011	Pixie Lott	"Love You to Death"	Young Foolish Happy
2011	One Direction	"Taken"	Up All Night
2011	Big Time Rush	"Cover Girl"	Elevate
2011	Dia Frampton	"Daniel"	Red
2012	Koda Kumi	"Boom Boom Boys"	Japonesque
2012	BoA	"One Dream" feat. Henry Lau and Key	Only One
2012	Susan Justice	"Born Bob Dylan"	Eat Dirt
2012	Susan Justice	"Eat Dirt"	Eat Dirt
2012	Susan Justice	"Forbidden Fruits"	Eat Dirt
2012	Susan Justice	"Paper Planes"	Eat Dirt
2012	Susan Justice	"I Wonder"	Eat Dirt
2012	Susan Justice	"My Sweater"	Eat Dirt
2012	Susan Justice	"Just Imagine"	Eat Dirt
2012	Susan Justice	"Don't Be a Stranger"	Eat Dirt
2012	Susan Justice	"Hello Goodbye"	Eat Dirt
2012	Susan Justice	"You Were Meant to Sing"	Eat Dirt
2012	Susan Justice	"Company"	Eat Dirt
2012	Susan Justice	"Alive"	Eat Dirt
2012	Susan Justice	"Beachbum"	Eat Dirt
2012	Halestorm	"Here's to Us"	The Strange Case Of...
2012	Mandy Capristo	"Side Effects"	Grace
2012	Kris Allen	"Blindfolded"	Thank You Camellia
2012	Paloma Faith	"Blood, Sweat & Tears"	Fall to Grace
2012	Casey Abrams	"Simple Life"	Casey Abrams
2012	Rachel Crow	"Mean Girls"	Rachel Crow EP
2012	Rachel Crow	"My Kind of Wonderful"	Rachel Crow EP
2012	Carly Rae Jepsen	"Beautiful" with Justin Bieber	Kiss
2012	Carly Rae Jepsen	"Your Heart is a Muscle"	Kiss
2012	Kerli	"Immortal"	Frankenweenie OST
2012	Bridgit Mendler	"Postcard"	Hello My Name Is...
2012	Colbie Caillat	"Happy Christmas"	Christmas in the Sand
2012	One Direction	"Truly Madly Deeply"	Take Me Home
2012	Tulisa	"Steal My Breath Away"	The Female Boss
2012	Tulisa	"Kill Me Tonight"	The Female Boss
2013	Victoria Justice	"Girl Up"	Non-album single
2013	Coco Jones	"World is Dancing"	Made Of EP
2013	Marco Mengoni	"Non passerai"	Prontoacorrere
2013	Jessica Sanchez	"No One Compares" feat. Prince Royce	Me, You & the Music
2013	Jessica Sanchez	"In Your Hands"	Me, You & the Music
2013	Jessica Sanchez	"Drive By"	Me, You & the Music
2013	Jessica Sanchez	"Gentlemen"	Me, You & the Music
2013	Jana de Valck	"That's What Love Is"	Non-album single
2013	Cody Simpson	"Summertime of Our Lives"	Surfers Paradise
2013	Sophia Black	"Everything Breaks"	The Smurfs 2 OST
2013	Selena Gomez	"Nobody Does It Like You"	Stars Dance
2013	Kumi Koda	"Touch Down"	Summer Trip EP
2013	Lee DeWyze	"Who Would've Known"	Frames
2013	John Legend	"All of Me"	Love in the Future
2013	Krewella	"We Go Down"	Get Wet
2013	Shelea Frazier	"Have I Ever Told You"	Love Fell on Me
2013	Daughtry	"Cinderella"	Baptized
2013	Rebecca Ferguson	"Wonderful World"	Freedom
2013	Jason Derulo	"Vertigo" feat. Jordin Sparks	Talk Dirty
2013	Prince Royce	"Already Missing You" feat Selena Gomez	Soy el Mismo
2014	Sean Paul	"Pornstar" feat. Nyla & Brick and Lace	Full Frequency
2014	Sean Paul	"Hey Baby"	Full Frequency
2014	Koda Kumi	"Loaded" feat. Sean Paul	Bon Voyage
2014	Anastacia	"Broken Wings"	Resurrection
2014	Foxes	"Holding onto Heaven"	Glorious
2014	Tessanne Chin	"Count on My Love"	Count On My Love
2014	Tessanne Chin	"People Change"	Count On My Love
2014	Arty	"Up All Night" feat. Angel Taylor	Glorious
2014	Hilary Duff	"Chasing the Sun"	Breathe In. Breathe Out.
2014	Sofía Reyes	"Muevelo" feat. Wisin	Louder!
2014	Heffron Drive	"Parallel"	Happy Mistakes
2014	Colbie Caillat	"Bigger Love"	Gypsy Heart
2014	Colbie Caillat	"Him or You"	Gypsy Heart
2014	Colbie Caillat	"I Wish You Were Here"	Gypsy Heart
2014	Alex & Sierra	"Little Do You Know"	It's About Us
2014	Alex & Sierra	"Cheating"	It's About Us
2014	The Veronicas	"Did You Miss Me (I'm a Veronica)"	The Veronicas
2014	The Veronicas	"Line of Fire"	The Veronicas
2014	The Veronicas	"Born Bob Dylan"	The Veronicas
2014	The Veronicas	"Mad Love"	The Veronicas
2014	Madonna	"Living for Love"	Rebel Heart
2014	Jacky Cheung	"It's Not Too Late"	Wake Up Dreaming
2015	Madonna	"Unapologetic Bitch"	Rebel Heart
2015	Madonna	"Illuminati"	Rebel Heart
2015	Madonna	"Bitch I'm Madonna" feat. Nicki Minaj	Rebel Heart
2015	Madonna	"Hold Tight"	Rebel Heart
2015	Madonna	"Joan of Arc"	Rebel Heart
2015	Madonna	"Iconic" feat. Chance the Rapper & Mike Tyson	Rebel Heart
2015	Madonna	"Body Shop"	Rebel Heart
2015	Madonna	"Best Night"	Rebel Heart
2015	Madonna	"Ven Didi Vici" feat. Nas	Rebel Heart
2015	Madonna	"S.E.X."	Rebel Heart
2015	Madonna	"Graffiti Heart"	Rebel Heart
2015	Natalia Jiménez	"Creo en Mi"	Creo en Mi
2015	Natalia Jiménez	"Tu No Me Quieres Mas"	Creo en Mi
2015	Kumi Koda	"Sometimes Dreams Come True"	Walk of My Life
2015	Arty	"Stronger" feat. Ray Dalton	Glorious
2015	Sarah Riani	"Le Mond Est Mort"	Dark En Ciel
2015	Leona Lewis	"Fire Under My Feet"	I Am
2015	Hilary Duff	"Belong"	Breathe In. Breathe Out.
2015	Tori Kelly	"First Heartbreak"	Unbreakable Smile
2015	Leona Lewis	"I Am"	I Am
2015	TVXQ	"Rise as One"	Rise as God
2015	Prince Royce	"Lucky One"	Double Vision
2015	Leona Lewis	"Thunder"	I Am
2015	Leona Lewis	"You Knew Me When"	I Am
2015	Leona Lewis	"The Essence of Me"	I Am
2015	Leona Lewis	"I Got You"	I Am
2015	Leona Lewis	"Power"	I Am
2015	Leona Lewis	"Another Love Song"	I Am
2015	Leona Lewis	"Thank You"	I Am
2015	Leona Lewis	"Thick Skin"	I Am
2015	Leona Lewis	"The Best and the Worst"	I Am
2015	Various artists	"Love Song to the Earth"	Non-album single
2015	John Newman	"I'm Not Your Man"	Revolve
2015	John Newman	"Called It Off"	Revolve
2015	Olly Murs	"Love Shouldn't Be This Hard"	Never Been Better: Special Edition
2015	Take That	"Will You Be There for Me"	III
2016	Connie Talbot	"Dream Out Loud"	Matters to Me
2016	Lindsey Stirling	"Love's Just a Feeling" feat. Rooty	Brave Enough
2016	Colbie Caillat	"Like Tomorrow Never Comes"	The Malibu Sessions
2016	Colbie Caillat	"Don't Wanna Love You"	The Malibu Sessions
2016	LeAnn Rimes	"Outrageous Love"	Remnants
2016	LeAnn Rimes	"Love Is Love Is Love"	Remnants
2016	LeAnn Rimes	"Learning Your Language"	Remnants
2016	Fergie	"Life Goes On"	Double Dutchess
2017	Sofía Reyes	"De Aqui a la Luna"	Louder!
2017	Sofía Reyes	"Puedes Ver Pero No Tocar"	Louder!
2017	John Legend	"One Woman One Man"	Fifty Shades Darker OST
2017	Sarah Close	"Call Me Out"	Caught Up EP
2017	Illenium	"Feel Good" with Gryffin feat. Daya	Awake
2017	La'Porsha Renae	"Cover Up"	Already All Ready
2017	Sheryl Crow	"Woo Woo"	Be Myself
2017	Lea Michele	"Tornado"	Places
2017	Mary Lambert	"I'd Be Your Wife"	Bold EP
2017	Armin van Buuren	"Sunny Days" feat. Josh Cumbee	Balance
2017	Will Sparks	"Young and Free" feat. Priyanka Chopra	Non-album single
2017	Weezer	"Mexican Fender"	Pacific Daydream
2017	The Script	"Wonders"	Freedom Child
2017	The Script	"Eden"	Freedom Child
2017	Galantis	"Girls on Boys" with ROZES	The Aviary
2017	Fergie	"Save It Til Morning"	Double Dutchess
2017	Fergie	"Love is Pain"	Double Dutchess
2017	Demi Lovato	"Only Forever"	Tell Me You Love Me
2018	ROZES	"Where Would We Be" with Nicky Romero	Non-album single
2018	Fletcher	"I Believe You"	Non-album single
2018	Josh Groban	"Symphony"	Bridges
2018	Tony Hadley	"Tonight Belongs to Us"	Talking to the Moon
2018	Josh Groban	"Granted"	Bridges
2018	Felix Jaehn	"Keep Your Head Up" with Damien-N-Drix	Non-album single
2018	AFSHeeN	"Would It Be OK?" feat. Angel Taylor	Non-album single
2018	Josh Groban	"River"	Bridges
2018	Josh Groban	"We Will Meet Once Again" with Andrea Bocelli	Bridges
2018	Josh Groban	"More of You"	Bridges
2018	Josh Groban	"99 Years" with Jennifer Nettles	Bridges
2018	Josh Groban	"Bigger Than Us"	Bridges
2018	Josh Groban	"Signs"	Bridges
2018	Jess Glynne	"No One"	Always in Between
2018	Jess Glynne	"Insecurities"	Always in Between
2018	Calum Scott	"No Matter What"	Only Human: Special Edition
2019	Aurora	"Animal"	A Different Kind of Human (Step 2)
2019	Tayla Parx	Read Your Mind feat. Duckwrth	We Need to Talk
2019	Emily Bear	"I'm Not Alone"	Non-album single
2019	Emily Bear	"Emotions"	Emotions EP
2019	Koda Kumi	"Rich & Famous" feat. Sean Paul	Re(cord)
2019	Florian Picasso	"But Us" feat. Echosmith	Non-album single
2020	Stela Cole	"Woman of the Hour"	TBA
2020	John Legend	"Bigger Love"	Bigger Love
2020	Carrie Underwood	"Hallelujah" with John Legend	My Gift
2020	Paloma Faith	"Me Time"	Infinite Things
2020	Rahmania Astrini	"Shush"	Non-album single
2020	Marisha Wallace	"I'm Free"	TOMORROW
2020	Marisha Wallace	"Faith"	TOMORROW
2021	Rahmania Astrini	"Shush (The Only One)" feat. Conor Matthews	Non-album single
2021	Tayler Buono	"IFHU"	Non-album single
2021	The Veronicas	"GODZILLA"	GODZILLA
2021	The Veronicas	"Kaleidoscope"	GODZILLA
2021	The Veronicas	"In It To Win It"	GODZILLA
2021	Emiko Suzuki	"Players"	kIng
2021	Mickey Guyton	"If I Were a Boy"	Remember Her Name
2021	Kelly Clarkson	"Blessed"	When Christmas Comes Around...
