= Complete (The Veronicas album) =

Compilation album by The Veronicas
- Released: 18 March 2009 (Japan)
- Genre: Synthpop, pop rock, pop punk, alternative rock, new wave
- Label: Pony Canyon

The Veronicas chronology
| Revenge Is Sweeter Tour (2009) | Complete (2009) | The Veronicas (2014) |

Complete is a compilation album by Australian band The Veronicas which was released in Japan on 18 March 2009 by Pony Canyon, and Latin America on 11 August 2009.

The compilation album is a two-disc album that contains all the songs from their debut album The Secret Life of... and Hook Me Up and also includes 3 bonus tracks.

== Track listing ==
This is the track listing for the 2 disc album:

=== Disc one: The Secret Life of... ===
1. "4ever" (Lukasz "Dr. Luke" Gottwald, Max Martin) – 3:30
2. "Everything I'm Not" (Gottwald, Martin, Jess Origliasso, Lisa Origliasso, Rami) – 3:24
3. "When It All Falls Apart" (Josh Alexander, J. Origliasso, L. Origliasso, Billy Steinberg) – 3:15
4. "Revolution" (Chantal Kreviazuk, Raine Maida) – 3:07
5. "Secret" (Toby Gad, J. Origliasso, L. Origliasso) – 3:34
6. "Mouth Shut" (Toby Gad, J. Origliasso, L. Origliasso) – 3:39
7. "Leave Me Alone" (Alexander, J. Origliasso, L. Origliasso, Steinberg) – 3:31
8. "Speechless" (Toby Gad, J. Origliasso, L. Origliasso) – 3:58
9. "Heavily Broken" (Eric Nova, J. Origliasso, L. Origliasso) – 4:18
10. "I Could Get Used to This" (Alexander, J. Origliasso, L. Origliasso, Steinberg) – 3:16
11. "Nobody Wins" (Kara DioGuardi, Clif Magness, J. Origliasso, L. Origliasso) – 3:53
12. "Mother Mother" (Tracy Bonham) – 3:08
13. "Did Ya Think" (Clif Magness, Kara DioGuardi, J. Origliasso, L. Origliasso) – 2:45*

=== Disc two: Hook Me Up ===
1. "Untouched" (Toby Gad, Jessica Origliasso, Lisa Origliasso) – 4:14
2. "Hook Me Up" (J. Origliasso, L. Origliasso, Shelly Peiken, Greg Wells) – 2:56
3. "This Is How It Feels" (T. Gad, J. Origliasso, L. Origliasso) – 4:11
4. "This Love" (T. Gad, Kesha Sebert) – 2:59
5. "I Can't Stay Away" (Josh Alexander, Billy Steinberg) – 3:26
6. "Take Me on the Floor" (T. Gad, J. Origliasso, L. Origliasso) – 3:30
7. "I Don't Wanna Wait" (John Feldman, J. Origliasso, L. Origliasso) – 2:59
8. "Popular" (Beni Barca, T. Gad, J. Origliasso, L. Origliasso) – 2:44
9. "Revenge Is Sweeter (Than You Ever Were)" (T. Gad, J. Origliasso, L. Origliasso) – 3:43
10. "Someone Wake Me Up" (Alexander, J. Origliasso, L. Origliasso, Steinberg) – 3:35
11. "All I Have" (T. Gad, J. Origliasso, L. Origliasso) – 3:14
12. "In Another Life" (T. Gad, J. Origliasso, L. Origliasso) – 3:47
13. "Goodbye to You" (Smith) – 3:14*
14. "Insomnia" (T. Gad, J. Origliasso, L. Origliasso) – 3:38*

Songs with a * indicate that it is a bonus track.

== Release history ==
| Region | Date | Label | Format | Catalogue |
|---|---|---|---|---|
| Japan | 18 March 2009 | Pony Canyon | CD, digital download | PCCY-01908 |
| Latin America | 11 August 2009 | Warner Music | CD | 9362499633 |
