= I Can't Stay Away =

Single by The Veronicas

from the album Hook Me Up
- Released: July 2008
- Recorded: Cryptic Studios, Los Angeles, California
- Genre: Electronica, hard rock
- Length: 3:27
- Label: Sire
- Songwriters: Josh Alexander, Billy Steinberg
- Producers: Alexander, Steinberg

The Veronicas singles chronology
"Take Me on the Floor" (2008)	"I Can't Stay Away" (2008)	"Popular" (2008)

"I Can't Stay Away" is a song by Australian recording duo The Veronicas for their second studio album Hook Me Up (2007). Produced by Josh Alexander and Billy Steinberg, it was released as a radio single in July 2008 in Australia and New Zealand. Because The Veronicas were promoting the album and their future single "Take Me on the Floor", the group released "I Can't Stay Away".

Musically, "I Can't Stay Away" is an electronica-inspired rock and europop song. The song was compared to t.A.T.u.'s single "All About Us", which was originally co-written by Lisa and Jess Origliasso themselves. Lyrically, the song deals with the addiction to a person, physiologically, sexually and emotionally. The recording received favorable reviews from most contemporary critics who praised the vocal abilities and lyrical content. However, some criticised it as part of the album's content.

== Background and release ==
The group's singles from the second studio album Hook Me Up; title song with the same name and "Untouched" achieved critical and commercial success. The first peaked at number one on the Australian ARIA Singles Chart, which became the duos first number-one single in their native Australia and was certified platinum by the Australian Recording Industry Association (ARIA), denoting 70,000 shipments in Australia. The latter song became an international success. It peaked inside the top ten in Ireland, Australia, Canada, New Zealand and the United Kingdom. The song peaked at number seventeen on the US Billboard Hot 100, which made them the first Australian act since Kylie Minogue to achieve a top twenty single, which was held by Minogue's 2001 single "Can't Get You Out of My Head". After the success of these two singles, The Veronicas decided to release the future album singles in separate countries. "This Love" was served as the third Australian and New Zealand single, while "Take Me on the Floor" was the fourth Australian and New Zealand single, and the second single in United States and Canada. With these releases, the songs received moderate chart success.

In October 2007, the group begun their promotional tour The Hook Me Up Tour in Australia. During June–July 2008, the group begun promotional touring in Europe, Australia, New Zealand and the US. In New Zealand, the group hosted a Q&A competition on ZM Radio in order to meet The Veronicas in Auckland city. The group had then had released the song in New Zealand as a radio-airplay format in order to promote the album. The song was then served as a promotional radio format in Australia in July 2008 in order to promote their album and single "Take Me on the Floor". The song, along with "Untouched", "Take Me on The Floor" and "4Ever", was used as advertisement in New Zealand radio and television for their first world tour Revenge Is Sweeter Tour. Both "Take Me on The Floor" and "I Can't Stay Away" were released in the same month.

== Composition ==
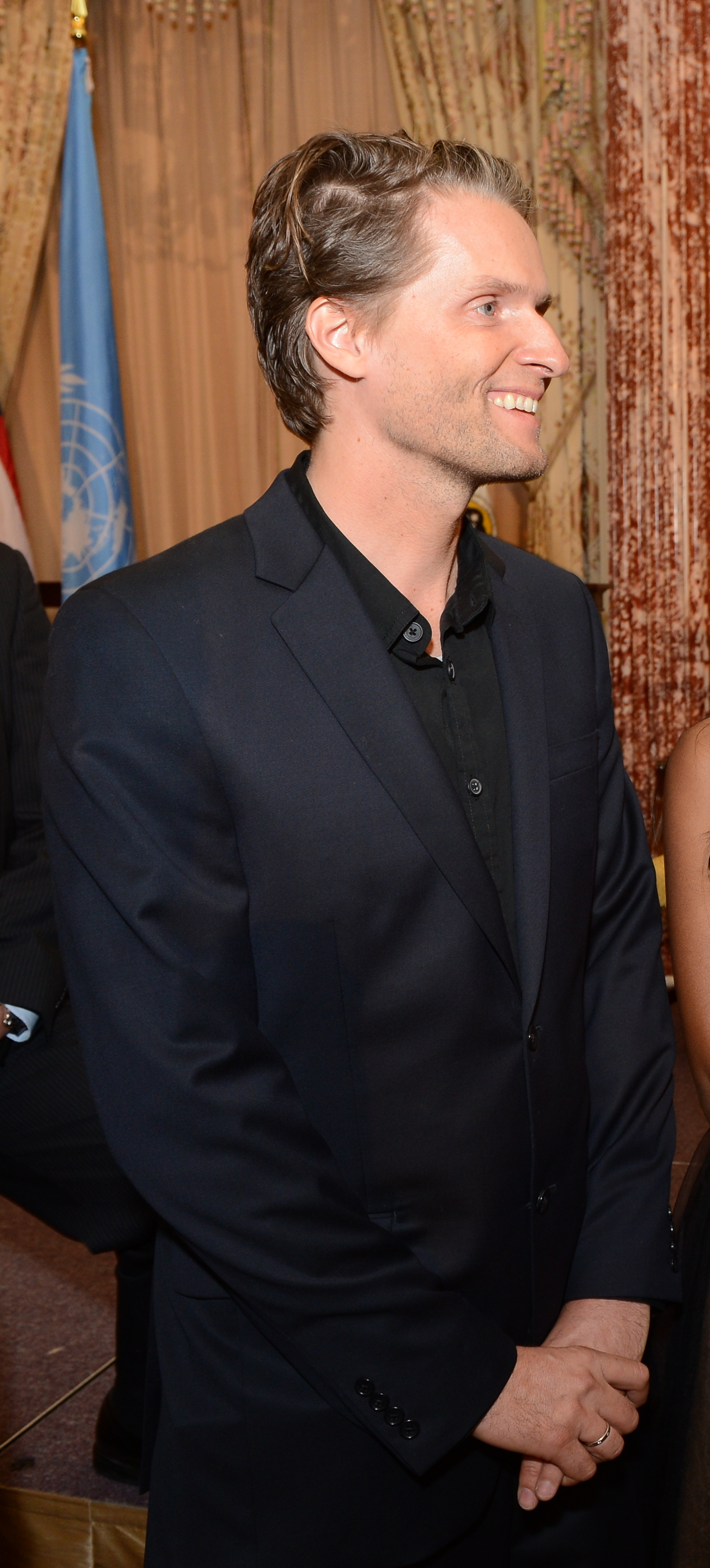
Toby Gad (pictured), who produced majority of the tracks, was not featured on "I Can't Stay Away".

Out of all twelve album tracks to Hook Me Up, "I Can't Stay Away" was the second of two songs, the other being "This Love", to have not been written by Jessica or Lisa Origliasso. The song was written by Josh Alexander and Billy Steinberg, as well as additional production. The song was also not recorded at The Veronicas home in Los Angeles, California and was recorded at Alexander's own studio Cryptic Studio and Dave Russell's Encore Studios, also located in Los Angeles. Majority of the instrumentation in the song was all digital, apart from the keyboards and guitars, which were all handled by Alexander. Alexander had programmed the entire song and had digitally altered the vocals and composition with assistant producer Chris Garcia and mixing assistant Brandon Kilgour.

"I Can't Stay Away" is a mid-tempo electronica-inspired rock song. The lyrical content deals with the addiction to a person, physiologically, sexually and emotionally and commissioning the addiction. The song's lyric "I'm conflicted / I inhale now but addicted" references the metaphorical use of drugs, asserting the person of addiction as a drug. The song is about a girl who can't stay away from this guy even though she knows she should, and details how the girl cannot get enough of the guy because of emotional distress and previous attachment.

Ben Norman from About.com had noted that while the parent album was upbeat and fun, he noted the influences of more "mature adult and moody" feelings. He noted "Revenge Is Sweeter (Than You Ever Were)," "This Love," and "I Can't Stay Away" as examples of these. K. Ross Hoffman from Allmusic and Evan Sawdey from PopMatters had compared the tracks composition to Russian duo t.A.T.u.'s singles "All The Things She Said" and "All About Us", which both Lisa and Jess had co-written for. Hoffman continued on his review on Allmusic; ""I Can't Stay Away" and "Someone Wake Me Up" echo the anguished Europop melodrama [...]" A reviewer from the Digital Fix had likened how it was compared to Laura Brannigan’s "Self Control" to great effect.

== Reception ==
"I Can't Stay Away" received favorable reviews from most music critics. Hoffman had highlighted the song as an album standout to Hook Me Up. He went on to praise Alexander's production for not being too similar to Max Martin, who produced the duos previous effort The Secret Life Of... Norman had highlighted the song as one of his favorites, along with "Revenge Is Sweeter (Than You Ever Were)" and "This Love". He said "[The songs] are all bittersweet in their lyrical content yet complete knockouts in musical delivery [...] The song is powerful and moving, the Origliassos' vocals soaring over one of the slower songs on the album." Michael Pascua from TheCelebrityCafe had likened how the song moved better with the slower tempo tracks which he exemplified "I Don't Wanna Wait" and "Revenge Is Sweeter (Than You Ever Were)". He also praised the songs "interesting" lyrics and composition. A reviewer from the online publication IndieLondon highlighted the song as an album download track. The reviewer commented "But such moments are offset by more successful offerings [...] the moody "I Can’t Stay Away", which benefits from a really good back-beat and plenty of sassiness [...]."

However, Sawdey was critical on the song's presence on the album and lyrics, saying "[Hook Me Up] either sacrifices lyrical clarity for the sake of a good hook (the title track) or just wind up pandering to listeners with overwrought generalities ("I Don’t Wanna Wait", the very T.A.T.U.-esque "I Can’t Stay Away")." He also pointed out that "Most of these weaker moments hit right in the dead center of the album, killing [Hook Me Up]'s early momentum far too soon, these weak tracks all blurring together in one dizzying haze, as if designed specifically to soundtrack the movements of cold strobelights in the middle of a sweaty club." David James Young from Sputnikmusic had felt that while the middle half of the album, including the song, tried too hard, he did say that "I Can't Stay Away" featured "some lively beats." A reviewer from State Magazine was critical towards the entire album, but said "Meanwhile -This Love' (unfortunately not a cover of the Pantera belter) and -I Can't Stay Away' translate as balladry filler on a record that really could do without it."

== Live performances ==
"I Can't Stay Away" has only been performed once, and that was on their Hook Me Up Tour 2007.

== Track listing ==
Digital download

1. "I Can't Stay Away" – 3:27

== Personnel ==
- Songwriting - Josh Alexander, Billy Steinberg
- Production - Alexander, Steinberg
- Instruments and programming - Alexander
- Mixing - Alexander
- Engineering – Alexander
- Lead and background vocals – Jessica Origliasso, Lisa Origliasso

== Release history ==
Country	Date	Format
Australia	30 October 2007	Digital download
Australia	July 2008	Mainstream airplay
New Zealand	30 October 2007	Digital download
New Zealand	July 2008	Mainstream airplay
