= List of top 10 singles for 2008 in Australia =

This is a list of singles that charted in the top ten of the ARIA Charts in 2008.

== Top-ten singles ==
Key

Symbol	Meaning
◁	Indicates single's top 10 entry was also its ARIA top 50 debut
(#)	2008 Year-end top 10 single position and rank

List of ARIA top ten singles that peaked in 2008
Top ten entry date	Single	Artist(s)	Peak	Peak date	Weeks in top ten	References
Singles from 2007
26 November	"Don't Hold Back"	The Potbelleez	5	28 January	12	
24 December	"Bleeding Love" (#4) ◁	Leona Lewis	1	21 January	17	
Singles from 2008
14 January	"Won't Go Home Without You"	Maroon 5	7	21 January	2	
28 January	"Pictures of You"	The Last Goodnight	3	18 February	12	
28 January	"Crank That (Soulja Boy)"	Soulja Boy Tell 'Em	3	31 March	11	
28 January	"I Never Liked You"	Rogue Traders	9	28 January	1	
4 February	"Piece of Me" ◁	Britney Spears	2	4 February	9	
4 February	"Don't Stop the Music"	Rihanna	1	18 February	12	
4 February	"Kiss Kiss"	Chris Brown featuring T-Pain	8	3 March	4	
11 February	"Wanna Be Startin' Somethin’"	Michael Jackson and Akon	8	11 February	3	
11 February	"Low" (#1)	Flo Rida featuring T-Pain	1	24 March	19	
10 March	"Tattoo"	Jordin Sparks	5	24 March	9	
17 March	"Naughty Girl"	Mr G	7	17 March	3	
17 March	"I Don't Do Surprises" ◁	Axle Whitehead	8	17 March	1	
17 March	"Work"	Kelly Rowland	6	31 March	8	
24 March	"Can't Sing a Different Song" ◁	Ricki-Lee	8	24 March	1	
31 March	"With You"	Chris Brown	5	14 April	7	
7 April	"Bubbly"	Colbie Caillat	1	7 April	7	
7 April	"Sweet About Me" (#3)	Gabriella Cilmi	1	14 April	14	
14 April	"4 Minutes" ◁	Madonna featuring Justin Timberlake and Timbaland	1	28 April	11	
14 April	"This Heart Attack"	Faker	9	14 April	2	
14 April	"Dream Catch Me"	Newton Faulkner	5	5 May	12	
28 April	"From Little Things Big Things Grow" ◁	The GetUp Mob	4	28 April	1	
5 May	"Better in Time"	Leona Lewis	6	19 May	5	
12 May	"Psycho Teddy"	Psycho Teddy	5	12 May	1	
12 May	"American Boy" ◁	Estelle featuring Kanye West	3	9 June	10	
12 May	"Perfect"	Vanessa Amorosi	4	16 June	6	
19 May	"Love in This Club"	Usher featuring Young Jeezy	8	19 May	3	
19 May	"This Love"	The Veronicas	10	19 May	1	
26 May	"No Air" (#8)	Jordin Sparks and Chris Brown	1	16 June	13	
26 May	"Take a Bow"	Rihanna	3	30 June	11	
2 June	"Love Song"	Sara Bareilles	4	30 June	9	
16 June	"Violet Hill"	Coldplay	9	23 June	2	
23 June	"Viva la Vida" ◁	Coldplay	2	30 June	6	
23 June	"See You Again"	Miley Cyrus	6	20 July	9	
30 June	"When I Grow Up"	The Pussycat Dolls	2	21 July	12	
7 July	"I Kissed A Girl" (#6)	Katy Perry	1	14 July	11	
7 July	"Forever"	Chris Brown	7	28 July	9	
14 July	"Closer"	Ne-Yo	8	22 September	5	
21 July	"Shake It"	Metro Station	2	11 August	14	
21 July	"Black and Gold"	Sam Sparro	4	28 July	5	
4 August	"All Summer Long" (#10)	Kid Rock	1	25 August	13	
4 August	"Just Dance" (#7)	Lady Gaga featuring Colby O'Donis	1	15 September	14	
11 August	"I'm Yours" (#9)	Jason Mraz	3	13 October	14	
25 August	"So What" (#2) ◁	Pink	1	22 September	16	
25 August	"Take Me on the Floor"	The Veronicas	7	25 August	4	
25 August	"Disturbia"	Rihanna	6	15 September	8	
8 September	"7 Things"	Miley Cyrus	10	8 September	1	
15 September	"Hot n Cold"	Katy Perry	4	27 October	13	
22 September	"Sex on Fire" (#5)	Kings of Leon	1	20 October	17	
22 September	"Electric Feel"	MGMT	7	13 October	6	
20 October	"Running Back"	Jessica Mauboy featuring Flo Rida	3	27 October	8	
20 October	"Womanizer"	Britney Spears	5	3 November	9	
27 October	"That's Not My Name"	The Ting Tings	8	27 October	2	
3 November	"If I Were A Boy"	Beyoncé	3	3 November	7	
3 November	"Poker Face"	Lady Gaga	1	17 November	16	
10 November	"I Hate This Part"	The Pussycat Dolls	10	10 November	1	
17 November	"Sober"	Pink	6	15 December	7	
17 November	"Live Your Life"	T.I. featuring Rihanna	3	15 December	11	
1 December	"You" ◁	Wes Carr	1	15 December	6	
15 December	"Circus"	Britney Spears	6	22 December	8	

=== 2007 peaks ===
List of ARIA top ten singles in 2008 that peaked in 2007
Top ten entry date	Single	Artist(s)	Peak	Peak date	Weeks in top ten	References
24 September	"The Way I Are" ◁	Timbaland featuring Keri Hilson and D.O.E.	1	29 October	18	
24 September	"How Far We've Come" ◁	Matchbox Twenty	7	22 October	14	
22 October	"Into the Night"	Santana featuring Chad Kroeger	4	26 November	15	
5 November	"Apologize" ◁	Timbaland featuring OneRepublic	1	26 November	17	
26 November	"Clumsy"	Fergie	3	26 November	9	
26 November	"No One"	Alicia Keys	3	17 December	13	
10 December	"Happy Ending"	Mika	7	10 December	8	
17 December	"Untouched" ◁	The Veronicas	2	24 December	13	

=== 2009 peaks ===
List of ARIA top ten singles in 2008 that peaked in 2009
Top ten entry date	Single	Artist(s)	Peak	Peak date	Weeks in top ten	References
10 November	"Use Somebody"	Kings of Leon	2	5 January	13	
8 December	"Single Ladies (Put a Ring on It)"	Beyoncé	5	5 January	8	
22 December	"Get Shaky"	The Ian Carey Project	2	26 January	13	

== Entries by artist ==
The following table shows artists who achieved two or more top 10 entries in 2008, including songs that reached their peak in 2007 and 2009. The figures include both main artists and featured artists. The total number of weeks an artist spent in the top ten in 2008 is also shown.

Entries	Artist	Weeks	Songs
4	Chris Brown	26	"Forever", "Kiss Kiss", "No Air", "With You"
4	Rihanna	38	"Disturbia", "Don't Stop the Music", "Live Your Life", "Take a Bow"
3	Britney Spears	20	"Circus", "Piece of Me", "Womanizer"
3	Timbaland	19	"4 Minutes", "Apologize", "The Way I Are"
3	The Veronicas	15	"Take Me on the Floor", "This Love", "Untouched"
2	Beyoncé	9	"If I Were A Boy", "Single Ladies (Put a Ring on It)"
2	Coldplay	7	"Violet Hill", "Viva la Vida"
2	Flo Rida	27	"Low", "Running Back"
2	Jordin Sparks	22	"No Air", "Tattoo"
2	Katy Perry	22	"Hot n Cold", "I Kissed A Girl"
2	Kings of Leon	15	"Sex on Fire", "Use Somebody"
2	Lady Gaga	22	"Just Dance", "Poker Face"
2	Leona Lewis	19	"Better in Time", "Bleeding Love"
2	Miley Cyrus	10	"7 Things", "See You Again"
2	Pink	20	"So What", "Sober"
2	The Pussycat Dolls	13	"I Hate This Part", "When I Grow Up"
2	T-Pain	20	"Kiss Kiss", "Low"
