= No Regrets =

No Regrets may refer to:

== Albums ==
- No Regrets (All-4-One album), 2009
- No Regrets (Dope album), 2009
- No Regrets (Elisabeth Withers album), 2010
- No Regrets (Faye Wong album), 1993
- No Regrets (Hardcore Superstar album), 2003
- No Regrets (Pandora album), 1999
- No Regrets (Leon Redbone album), 1988
- No Regrets (The Walker Brothers album), 1975
- No Regrets, album and title track thereof by Joe Sample & Randy Crawford, 2008

== Songs ==
- "No Regrets" (Amanda Lear song), 1983
- "No Regrets" (Dappy song), 2011
- "No Regrets" (Elisabeth Withers song), 2010 song from the same album
- "No Regrets" (Magic! song), 2016
- "No Regrets" (Robbie Williams song), 1998
- "No Regrets" (Tom Rush song), 1968, re-recorded 1974 and subsequently covered by numerous artists
- "No Regrets", a song by Aesop Rock, from the album Labor Days
- "No Regrets", a song by Bon Jovi, from the album Bounce
- "No Regrets", a song by Eminem, from the album Music to Be Murdered By
- "No Regrets", a song by Gob, from the album The World According to Gob
- "No Regrets", a song written by Harry Tobias and Roy Ingraham, and first recorded by Henry King and His Orchestra, 1936
- "No Regrets", a song by Masta Ace, from the album Disposable Arts
- "No Regrets", a song by Phoebe Snow, from the album Second Childhood (a cover of the Tobias/Ingraham composition)
- "No Regrets", a song by Sugababes from The Lost Tapes
- "No Regrets", a song by Tom Cochrane, from the album Mad Mad World
- "Non, je ne regrette rien" (English translation "No, I regret nothing"; often titled "No Regrets"), a 1956 song best known from Édith Piaf's version

== Television ==
- No Regrets (TV series), a Hong Kong television drama produced by TVB
- "No Regrets" (Agents of S.H.I.E.L.D.)

== Other ==
- No Regrets (book), a 2011 book co-written by former Kiss lead guitarist Ace Frehley

== See also ==
- Best Regrets (disambiguation)
- No Regret (disambiguation)
