= Michelle Bell =

American singer-songwriter

Michelle Lynn Bell
- Born: Ohio, U.S.
- Genres: Pop; R&B
- Occupations: Songwriter; record producer
- Years active: 2000–present

Michelle Bell is an American singer-songwriter and record producer. With Sean Combs she wrote and produced tracks for Jennifer Lopez. Following the release of Lopez's album, she worked with artists, including Britney Spears, Girls Aloud, Mary J. Blige and Paulina Rubio.

== Biography ==
Michelle Lynn Bell was born in Canton, Ohio. While in college she worked on a local paper while she was in college, and used to write to publicists at record labels.

She worked with Sean Combs, who was dating pop singer Jennifer Lopez at the time. After Bell's song was presented to Lopez, the latter recorded the track. Bell then went to work with several artists such as Mary J. Blige and Paulina Rubio over the years.

In 2002, she started to work with Britney Spears on her fourth studio album In the Zone. Together they wrote and recorded several tracks, including "Chaotic", "Like I'm Falling", "Look Who's Talking Now", and "Money, Love, & Happiness". "(I've Just Begun) Having My Fun", another track recorded by Spears and later released on Greatest Hits: My Prerogative (2004), was featured on the soundtrack of the 2011 film Bridesmaids. Bell later worked with producer Peter Wade Keusch. Together, they formed a music production duo, and worked for artists such as 88-Keys and Lindsay Lohan. They worked together on an album called The Mystery LLP. It was slated for a release on the second quarter of 2008; the album, however, is yet to be released. Bell currently lives in New York City.

== Reception ==
Bell's songs were mostly well received by contemporary critics. One of her tracks she wrote with Britney Spears, "I've Just Begun (Having My Fun)", was considered by Stephen Thomas Erlewine of Allmusic as better "[than] most of the songs that were featured on [In the Zone]," while Mike McGuirk of Rhapsody said the song "is on a level with her best work, namely 'I'm a Slave 4 U'." Bell's tracks included on Jennifer Lopez's album Brave (2007) received mixed to positive reviews, with "I Need Love" being considered as a "nice enough uptempo groove. Still, it's not something you'll be rushing to hear a second time — a sentiment that summarizes most of 'Brave'." "Morning After Dark", a track co-wrote with Timbaland, was considered as "catchy" by reviewers, with its hook receiving positive appreciation. However, Jennifer Lopez's "Come Over" did not impress critics, with Tom Sinclair of Entertainment Weekly saying, "'Come to my room for a little game.… I'll do very erotic things', she breathes on 'Come Over', [...] the most embarrassing satin sheet anthem since, oh, Sylvia's 'Pillow Talk'." The song received comparisons to earlier works of Janet Jackson.

== Songwriting discography ==
Year	Album	Artist	Ref.
2001	Come Over	Jennifer Lopez	
2001	Testimony	Mary J. Blige	
2001	Think	Toya	
2001	The Truth	Toya	
2001	What Else Can I Do	Toya	
2001	At The Bar	T.I.	
2002	Doo Rags	Nas	
2002	High Fashion	3LW	
2002	A Girl Can Mack	3LW	
2002	Stereo	Paulina Rubio	
2002	Supernatural	Sugababes	
2003	Impatient	Blu Cantrell	
2003	Don't Want You Back	Girls Aloud	
2003	Chaotic	Britney Spears	
2003	Conscious	Britney Spears	
2003	I've Just Begun (Having My Fun)	Britney Spears	
2003	Look Who's Talking Now	Britney Spears	(Note: Look Who's Talking Now was not included on Britney Spears' fourth studio album In the Zone. The track was later recorded by Korean pop singer BoA and included on her album eponymous album released in 2009. However, Spears' version of the track leaked on January 9, 2012.)
2003	Money Love and Happiness	Britney Spears	
2003	Peep Show	Britney Spears	
2003	Take Off	Britney Spears	
2003	Disguise My Love	Britney Spears	
2006	Fire	Kelis	
2007	It Can Happen	Elisabeth Withers	
2007	Get Your Shoes On	Elisabeth Withers	
2007	Be Mine	Jennifer Lopez	
2007	Frozen Moments	Jennifer Lopez	
2007	I Need Love	Jennifer Lopez	
2007	Never Gonna Give Up	Jennifer Lopez	
2007	The Way It Is	Jennifer Lopez	
2008	Almond Joy	Tittswort	
2008	Portrait of Love	Cheri Dennis	
2008	Morning Wood	88-Keys	
2009	Morning After Dark	Timbaland (featuring Soshy and Nelly Furtado)	
2009	Can't Hide from Love	Fame soundtrack	
2009	Amazing	Alex Young	
2009	Broken Heart	Alex Young	
2009	Kisses Wishes	Alex Young	
2009	Rendezvous	Alex Young	
2009	Seeing is Believing	Alex Young	
2012	Butterflies	Medina	
2012	Hotels	Medina	
2012	Good to You	Medina	
2013	The Flow	Bilal	
2014	Relationshit	Soshy	
2014	Bang Bang	Soshy	
2014	Need You Now	Macy Gray	
2014	Bad Things	Aneta Sablik	
2014	Crazy/Rosie	Love, Rosie soundtrack	
2015	Drums Talk	Maude Herchab	
2015	Take A Chance	Antonique Smith	
2015	Choices	E-40	
2016	Something Different	Clairy Browne	
2016	Choices	American Honey soundtrack	
2017	Come Alive	Johnny Manuel	
