= No Regret =

No Regret may refer to:

- No Regret (album), a 2000 album by Lonnie Gordon
- No Regret (film), a 2006 South Korean film
- "No Regret" (song), a 2006 song by Kumi Koda
- No Regret (1986 film), a South Korean film starring Nam Koong Won
- No Regret (1987 film), a Hong Kong film starring Carol Yeung Ling
- Crusader: No Regret, a 1996 action computer game

== See also ==
- Regret-free decision theory.
- No Regret Life, a Japanese rock band
- No Regrets (disambiguation)
