= Brown & Gray =

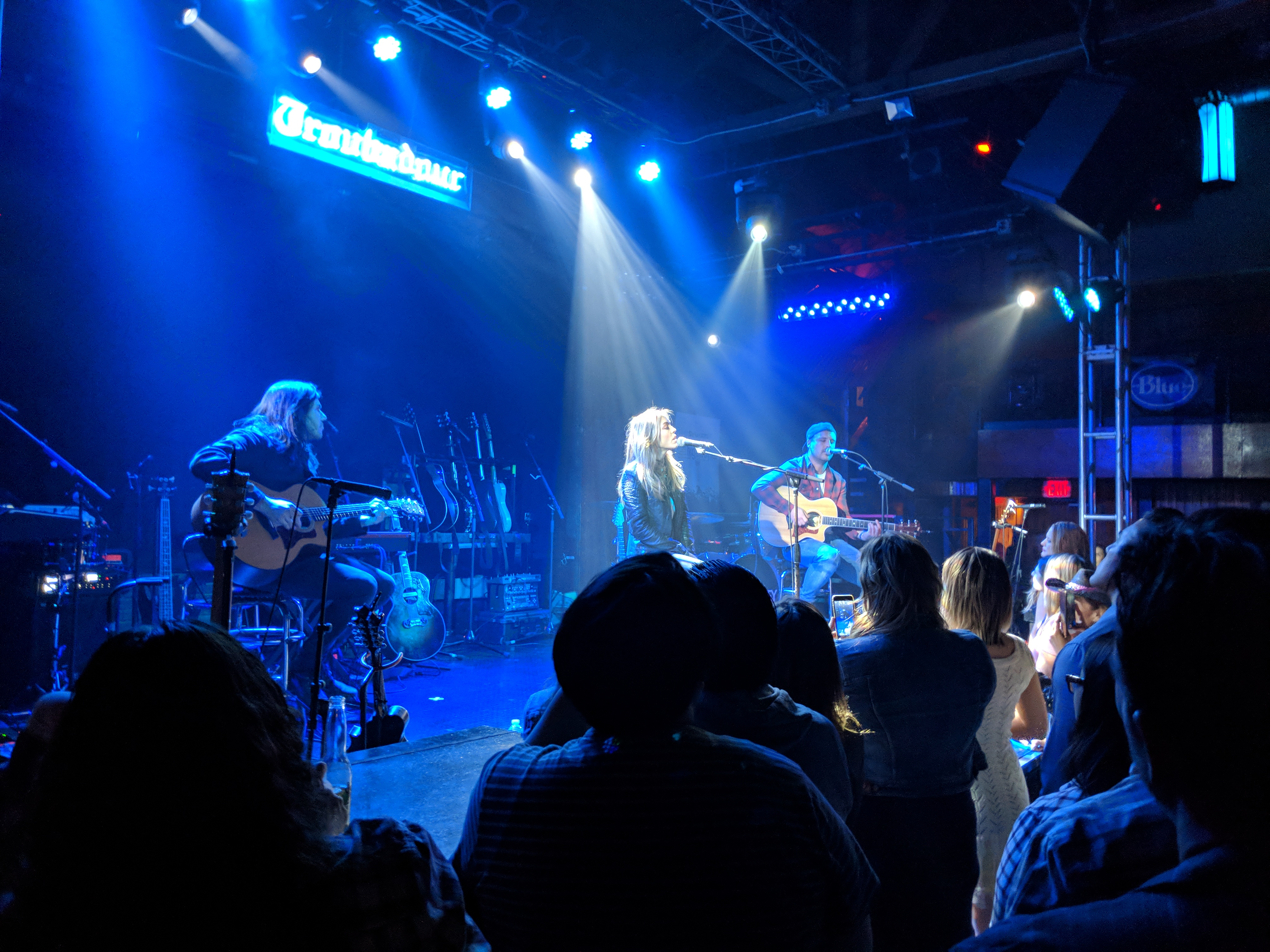
- Brown & Gray live at The Troubadour in Los Angeles in 2017

Background information
- Origin: Los Angeles and London
- Genres: Country, pop
- Years active: 2017–present
- Labels: NHMM
- Members: Kaci Brown, Sam Gray
- Website: http://www.brownandgraymusic.com/

Brown & Gray is a British/American country-pop duo based in London and Los Angeles. The duo is composed of singer/songwriters Kaci Brown and Sam Gray.

== History ==
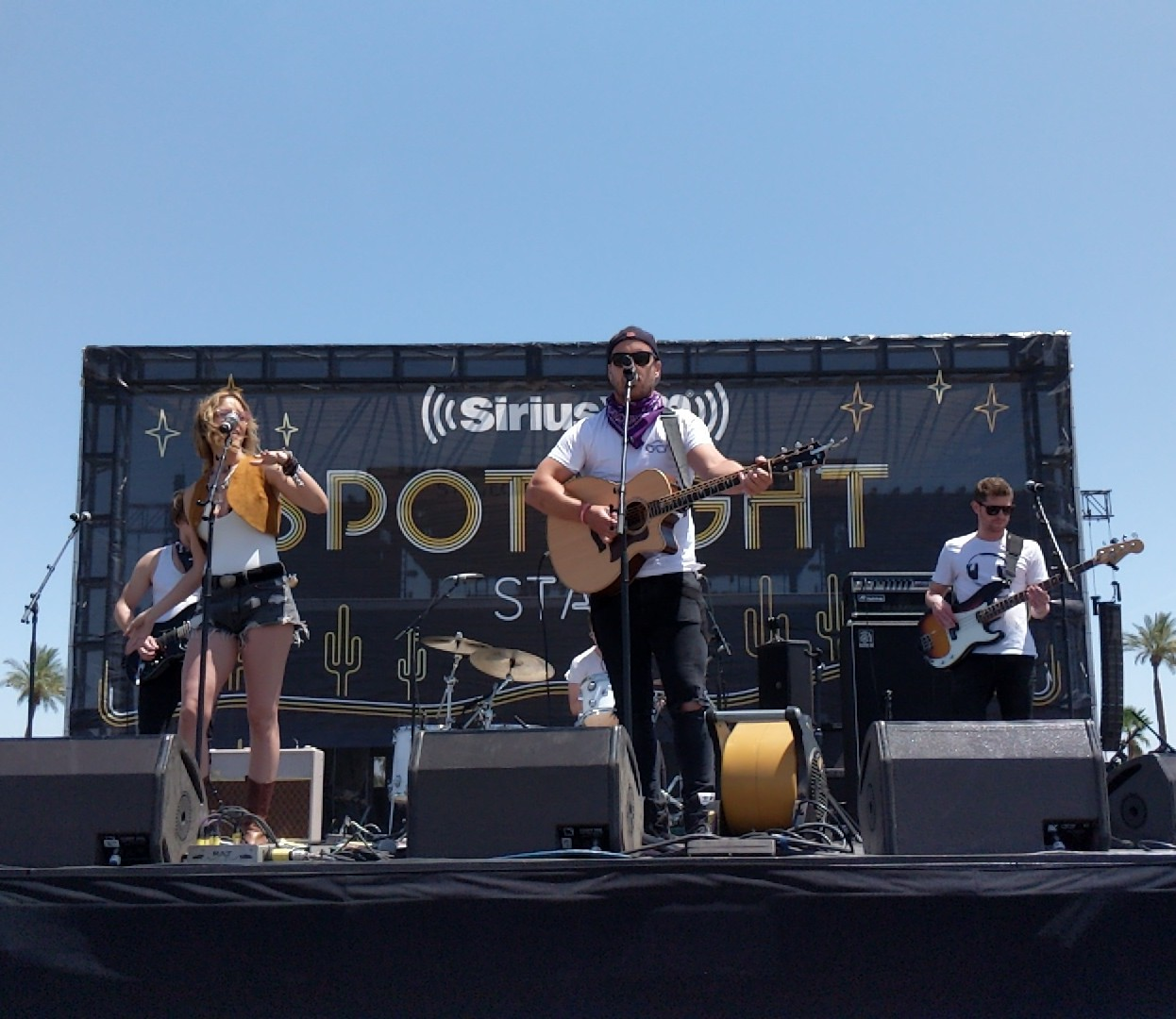
Brown & Gray performing at Stagecoach 2018 on the SiriusXM Spotlight stage.

Sam and Kaci first started working together as Brown & Gray after Gray wrote a country song, but wasn't satisfied with the vocals. Management at Notting Hill Music brought Brown into the project, and the song developed into what is known today as "Top Down". "Top Down" was released in mid-2017, and was soon featured substantially by Apple Music and Radio Disney Country. Since September 2017, the video for "Top Down" has garnered over 860k views on YouTube. That same month, SiriusXM's country music station, The Highway, named Brown & Gray as a Highway Find Artist.

Brown & Gray also performed a number of shows as part of The Highway Finds Tour: Fall 2017. In early 2018, CMT chose to select Brown & Gray as part of their CMT Discovery Artist program. In April 2018, Brown & Gray performed at Stagecoach in Indio, CA on the SiriusXM Spotlight Stage.

== Members ==
- Kaci Brown - vocals
- Sam Gray - guitar and vocals

== Discography ==
=== Singles ===
- "Top Down" (2017)
- "Top Down (Kue Remix)" (2017)
- "It's Not Christmas ('Til You Come Around)" (2017)
- "Top Down (Gawler Remix)" (2017)
- "Top Down (Nashville Mix)" (2018)
- "Top Down (Acoustic)" (2018)

=== EPs ===
- "Salt in the Coffee" (2018)

=== Music Videos ===
- "Top Down" (2017)
