= The Art of Love (album) =

Studio album by Sandra
- Released: 23 February 2007
- Genres: Pop, Rock
- Length: 54:44
- Label: Virgin
- Producer: Jens Gad

Sandra chronology
Reflections (2006)	The Art of Love (2007)	Back to Life (2009)

Professional ratings
Review scores
Source	Rating
laut.de	1/5 stars

"What Is It About Me" single cover

The Art of Love is the eighth studio album by German singer Sandra released in 2007 by Virgin Records.

== Background ==
The Art of Love is Sandra's first album not to be produced by her then-partner, Michael Cretu, who at that time was unavailable due to working on the new Enigma album, A Posteriori. It was also her last album released before their separation in late 2007. Instead, the material was produced by Jens Gad, Cretu's "right hand man". This change made Sandra actively participate in writing songs for the first time in her career. She contributed very personal lyrics, revisiting sad experiences from her childhood. The album also features a more contemporary rock-leaning sound than a lot of her previous releases. The album also includes three cover versions: "Put Your Arms Around Me" originally recorded by Sinéad O'Connor, "All You Zombies" by The Hooters, and "Casino Royale", previously recorded by Edyta Górniak as "Sleep with Me" and Conjure One as "Sleep". "Love Is the Price" features DJ BoBo and is their second collaboration, after the 2006 hit "Secrets of Love". The promotional pictures for the album, shot in New York by Bärbel Miebach, saw Sandra return to her signature long hair and reveal a sexier image.

"The Way I Am" was released as the lead single from the album in January 2007 and reached no. 50 on the official German singles chart. It included two bonus tracks, "Logical Love" a new song where Sandra indulges in rapping for the first time, and "Sleep" the alternative version of "Casino Royale" with its original lyrics.

"What Is It About Me" was released as the second single in May 2007 and failed to chart except for some airplay in Russian Tophit charts reaching position 129.The single had three bonus tracks: the album track "What D'Ya Think of Me", French version of "What's Left to Say" ("Les qu'est-ce que c'est") and Spanish version of "Silence Beside Me" ("Silencio a mi lado"). "All You Zombies" was released as a promotional radio single in Poland and did well there. The album itself was a top 40 chart success in Germany and Poland.

== Track listing ==
1. "What D'Ya Think of Me" (Jens Gad, Sandra Cretu) – 4:34
2. "The Way I Am" (Jens Gad, Sandra Cretu, Andru Donalds) – 3:31
3. "The Art of Love" (Jens Gad, Sandra Cretu) – 4:14
4. "What Is It About Me" (Winston Sela, Jens Gad, Torsten Stenzel, Ginger Mackenzie) – 3:54
5. "Dear God... If You Exist" (Jens Gad, Sandra Cretu) – 4:27
6. "Silence Beside Me" (Jens Gad, Sandra Cretu) – 3:38
7. "Once Upon a Time" (Fabrice Cuidad, Jens Gad, Sandra Cretu) – 4:52
8. "Put Your Arms Around Me" (Sinéad O'Connor, Rick Nowels) – 5:05
9. "What's Left to Say" (Fabrice Cuidad, Jens Gad, Christian Dornaus) – 4:36
10. "Casino Royale" (Rick Nowels, Billy Steinberg, Marie-Claire D'Ubaldo) – 3:51
11. "Love Is the Price" (with DJ BoBo) (Morrison Long, Steven Levis) – 3:23
12. "Shadow of Power" (Fabrice Cuidad, Jens Gad, Sandra Cretu) – 3:36
13. "All You Zombies" (Eric Bazilian, Rob Hyman) – 5:03

== Charts ==
Chart (2007)	Peak position
French Albums (SNEP)	159
German Albums (Offizielle Top 100)	16
Polish Albums (ZPAV)	26
Swiss Albums (Schweizer Hitparade)	88

== Certifications ==
Region	Certification	Certified units/sales
Russia (NFPF)	Gold	10,000^{*}
^{*} Sales figures based on certification alone.
