= Sam Gray (musician) =

- Also known as: JUIC3BOX
- Born: Samuel Gray; Hull, England
- Genres: Pop rock, country
- Occupations: Singer-songwriter, musician
- Instruments: Vocals, guitar
- Years active: 2010–present
- Label: NHMM
- Website: brownandgraymusic.com

Samuel Gray is an English singer and songwriter from Hull, England, who has composed songs for a multitude of artists including The Chainsmokers, Tiesto, Meduza, Kygo, Nicky Romero, TELYkast, Hardwell, DJ Katch, Solano, Omi, Casey Barnes, Manovski, Jonas Blue, Teddy Swims, Ava Max, Duvall, Ben Saunders, Alle Farben, Julian Martel, The Magician, Julian Perretta, Hayla, Hozier, Example, Nile Rodgers, Armin van Buuren, and Tobtok, garnering over 2 billion streams in the process along with multiple top chart hits around the world.

== Career ==
Following his success as a songwriter in 2010, Gray embarked on a solo career with his three-piece band and toured as a special guest for The Overtones, East 17, Westlife, David Ford, Charlie Simpson, and Peter Andre, playing venues such as The O2 Arena and the London Palladium.

His debut album Brighter Day was released on 24 October 2011, and featured his previously BBC Radio 2 playlisted debut single, "Cartwheel Queen", and "Two Hearts", the original song covered by Ben Saunders. The album was produced by Brendan Lynch and featured several guest musicians, including drummers Steve White and Alan White, along with Ocean Colour Scene bassist Damon Minchella.

In November 2011, Gray was named as Caffè Nero's Artist of the Month for November and December, coinciding with a nationwide tour of their coffee shops until the end of the year.

Alongside Danish DJ and producer Jack Rowan, Gray competed in the 2013 Danish National Song Contest, the Danish national selection for the 2013 Eurovision Song Contest. They performed the song "Invincible", which was eliminated in the finals.

Under the moniker JUIC3BOX, Sam partnered with singer-songwriter Alice France to release the single "True Love". The single has surpassed 2.2 million streams, and was added to the SiriusXM BPM playlist.

Gray is currently writing and performing with Kaci Brown as one half of country music duo, Brown & Gray. Their debut single has surpassed 25 million streams and 3 million YouTube plays. The same track, "Top Down", is a Highway Find in the US, and featured on the BBC Radio 2's B Playlist in the UK.

== Discography ==
=== Albums ===
Year	Album	Peak chart position	Notes
2011	Brighter Day	N/A	
2013	Too Much of a Good Thing	N/A	

=== Singles ===
Year	Single	Peak chart position	Notes
2011	"Cartwheel Queen"	N/A	
2011	"Brighter Day"	N/A	
2012	"All of My Life"	N/A	
2012	"This Girl"	N/A	
2013	"One Night Stand"	N/A	
2017	"Top Down"	N/A	As Brown and Gray
2017	"It's Not Christmas ('Til You Come Around)"	N/A	As Brown and Gray
2021	"Unbreakable" (Feat. TELYkast)	N/A	
2022	Good Feeling	N/A	
2022	"Human Touch" with Armin Van Buuren	N/A	
