= No Regrets (Elisabeth Withers song) =

Single by Elisabeth Withers

from the album No Regrets
- Released: May 18, 2010
- Genre: R&B, soul
- Length: 3:57
- Label: E1
- Songwriters: Elisabeth Withers, Gordon Chambers, Barry Eastmond
- Producers: Gordon Chambers, Barry Eastmond

Elisabeth Withers singles chronology
"Need Love" (2010)	"No Regrets" (2010)

"No Regrets" is a song recorded by American singer-songwriter Elisabeth Withers. It was released by E1 Records on May 18, 2010 as the second single from Withers' second studio album of the same name (2010). It was written by Withers, Gordon Chambers, and Barry Eastmond, and produced by the latter pair.

== Charts ==
Chart (2010)	Peak position
U.S. Billboard Hot R&B/Hip-Hop Songs	62

== Release history ==
Region	Date	Label
United States	May 18, 2010	E1 Records
