= Best Regrets =

Best Regrets may refer to:

- "Best Regrets", a song by Geneva, from the album Further, 1997
- "Best Regrets", a song by They Might Be Giants, from the album My Murdered Remains, 2018

== See also ==
- No Regrets (disambiguation)
