= It Can Happen to Anyone =

Studio album by Elisabeth Withers
- Released: January 30, 2007
- Genres: Soul, R&B, neo soul
- Label: Blue Note Records
- Producer: Toby Gad

Elisabeth Withers chronology
It Can Happen to Anyone (2007)	No Regrets (2010)

Professional ratings
Review scores
Source	Rating
USA Today	3/4 stars

It Can Happen to Anyone is the debut studio album by American neo soul and R&B singer-songwriter Elisabeth Withers, released by Blue Note Records on January 30, 2007.

== Track listing ==
No.	Title	Composer(s)	Length
1.	"Simple Things"	Toby Gad, Elisabeth Withers	3:53
2.	"Heartstrings"	Gordon Chambers, Barry Eastmons, Withers	4:32
3.	"Listen"	Gad, Withers	3:32
4.	"It Can Happen"	Michelle Bell, Joe Belmaati, Hansen	3:34
5.	"Get Your Shoes On"	Bell, Fredrik Õdesjõ	2:55
6.	"Be With You"	Gad, Withers	3:37
7.	"The World Ain't Ready"	Gad, Withers	3:39
8.	"Somebody"	Gad, Withers	3:35
9.	"Wind Beneath My Wings"	Larry Henley, Jeffrey Silbar	4:33
10.	"Sweat"	Gad, Withers	3:01
11.	"Next To You"	Withers	3:07

== Charts ==
Chart (2007)	Peak position
U.S. Billboard Top R&B/Hip-Hop Albums	32
U.S. Billboard Heatseekers Albums	7
