= The Night Is Still Young (Sandra song) =

Single by Sandra and Thomas Anders

from the album Back to Life
- B-side: "Redis moi"
- Released: 8 May 2009
- Genre: Pop
- Length: 3:22
- Label: Virgin
- Songwriter(s): Toby Gad, Audrey Martells
- Producer(s): Jens Gad

Sandra singles chronology
"In a Heartbeat" (2009)	"The Night Is Still Young" (2009)	"Maybe Tonight" (2012)

Thomas Anders singles chronology
"Kisses for Christmas" (2008)	"The Night Is Still Young" (2009)	"Why Do You Cry" (2010)

Music video
- "The Night Is Still Young" on YouTube

"The Night Is Still Young" is a 2009 song performed by German singer Sandra featuring Thomas Anders. The song was written by Toby Gad and Audrey Martells, and produced by Jens Gad. It was released in May 2009 as the second single from Sandra's ninth studio album Back to Life and was moderately successful on the German singles chart. The CD single also includes Sandra's solo version of the song as well as the English-French track "Redis moi" available only on the digital edition of Back to Life. The music video for "The Night Is Still Young" was filmed in Ibiza by Susanne Sigi.

== Track listing ==
- CD maxi single/digital download
1. "The Night Is Still Young" – 3:22
2. "The Night Is Still Young" (Casa Sylt Mix) – 4:45
3. "The Night Is Still Young" (Solo Version) – 3:22
4. "Redis moi" – 3:45

== Charts ==
Chart (2009)	Peak position
Germany (Media Control)	46
Poland (ZPAV)	32
Russian Airplay(Tophit)	135
