= Instigator (album) =

Studio album by Kaci Brown
- Released: August 9, 2005
- Recorded: 2004–2005
- Genre: Pop, R&B
- Length: 40:43
- Label: Interscope
- Producer: Kaci Brown; Toby Gad

Instigator is the debut album by Pop and R&B singer Kaci Brown. The album was released on August 9, 2005. "Unbelievable" was the first single released from the album. The second single was "Instigator", which features VA Slim and El Fudge.

Brown wrote most of the songs on the album.

== Critical reception ==
The Chicago Tribune wrote that Instigator "is loaded with the sort of sassy, danceable songs Britney Spears used to do really well." USA Today's review gave the album two and a half stars out of four, and said that Brown "has a breathy but fluid voice that nods to influences ranging from Jewel to Mariah Carey." The Morning Call wrote, "For the bubblegum pop aficionado... it's not a bad album." PopMatters gave the album a rating of two out of ten, and wrote, "With the exception of two songs that demonstrate a burgeoning talent both as a writer and a vocalist, the rest of Kaci’s CD is positively puerile."

== Track listing ==
1. "Unbelievable" 4:08
2. "Instigator" 4:11
3. "Cadillac Hotel" 4:23
4. "Body Language" 3:20
5. "The Waltz" 4:06
6. "SOS" 3:10
7. "Like 'Em Like That" 3:26
8. "My Baby" 3:48
9. "You Fool" 3:49
10. "Make You Love Me" 3:21
11. "Thank You" 2:59
