= Back to Life (Sandra album) =

Studio album by Sandra
- Released: 27 March 2009
- Genre: Pop, Hip hop
- Length: 52:48 (CD edition); 1:01:02 (digital edition)
- Label: Virgin
- Producer: Jens Gad, Olaf Menges, Axel Breitung, Zippy Davids, Michael Kunzi, Tuneverse

Sandra chronology
The Art of Love (2007)	Back to Life (2009)	The Platinum Collection (2009)

Singles from Back to Life
- 1. "In a Heartbeat" Released: 6 March 2009; 2. "The Night Is Still Young" Released: 8 May 2009

Back to Life is the ninth studio album by German singer Sandra, released in 2009 by Virgin Records.

== Background ==
The album was recorded in New York and largely produced by Jens Gad. Most of the songs were co-written by his younger brother, Toby Gad. As opposed to the preceding album, The Art of Love, which was created during a difficult time in Sandra's life, material on Back to Life has more upbeat and optimistic feel, and has a more contemporary club sound than most of Sandra's releases. She raps on several tracks. Back to Life spawned two singles, "In a Heartbeat" and a duet with Thomas Anders, "The Night Is Still Young", which were moderately successful in Germany. The album itself was a top 40 chart success on the German albums chart.

== Track listing ==
1. "R U Feeling Me" (Toby Gad, Faith Trent, Nina Ossovl) – 3:43
2. "Once in a Lifetime" (Toby Gad, Audrey Martells) – 3:50
3. "In a Heartbeat" (Toby Gad, Jim Dyke) – 3:36
4. "The Night Is Still Young" (Featuring Thomas Anders) (Toby Gad, Audrey Martells) – 3:20
5. "Just like Breathing" (Toby Gad, Madeline Stone, Sam Lorber) – 3:14
6. "Never Before" (Axel Breitung) – 3:44
7. "Always on My Mind" (Toby Gad, Kristin Steiv, Shayna Steiv) – 3:17
8. "Behind Those Words" (Alex Geringas, Jade Ell) – 3:04
9. "What If" (Toby Gad, Jadyn Maria) – 2:48
10. "Say Love" (Frederik Thomander, Anders Wikström, Agnes Carlsson) – 3:27
11. "Put Some 80ies in It" (Christian Königseder, Alexander Komlew, Caroline von Brünken, Michael Kunzi) – 3:22
12. "These Moments" (Toby Gad, Carlos sin Morera) – 3:28
13. "I Want You" (Toby Gad, Jaqueline Nemorin) – 3:51
14. "Tête à tête" (Sandra Cretu, Fabrice Cuidad, Jens Gad) – 3:44
15. "Who I Am" (Toby Gad, Willa Ford) – 4:05

Digital edition bonus tracks
16. "Redis moi" (Sandra Cretu, Fabrice Cuidad, Jens Gad) – 3:42
17. "Echo of My Heart" – 4:32

== Charts ==
Chart (2009)	Peak position
Czech Albums (ČNS IFPI)	47
German Albums (Offizielle Top 100)	26
Swiss Albums (Schweizer Hitparade)	83
