= In a Heartbeat (Sandra song) =

Single by Sandra

from the album Back to Life
- B-side: "These Moments"; "Kiss My..."
- Released: 6 March 2009
- Genre: Pop
- Length: 3:36
- Label: Virgin
- Songwriter(s): Toby Gad, Jim Dyke
- Producer(s): Jens Gad

Sandra singles chronology
"What Is It About Me" (2007)	"In a Heartbeat" (2009)	"The Night Is Still Young" (2009)

"In a Heartbeat" is a pop song by German singer Sandra, written by Toby Gad and Jim Dyke, and produced by Jens Gad. The song was released in March 2009 as the lead single from Sandra's ninth studio album Back to Life. The single's B-sides were the album song "These Moments" and a non-album exclusive track "Kiss My...". No official music video has been filmed for the song. "In a Heartbeat" was a minor success on the German singles chart.

== Track listing ==
- CD maxi single/digital download
1. "In a Heartbeat" (Album Version) – 3:36
2. "In a Heartbeat" (NYC 38th Street Mix) – 5:21
3. "These Moments" (Album Version) – 3:29
4. "Kiss My..." – 3:07

== Charts ==
Chart (2009)	Peak position
Germany (Media Control)	59
