= Kaci Brown =

American singer and songwriter

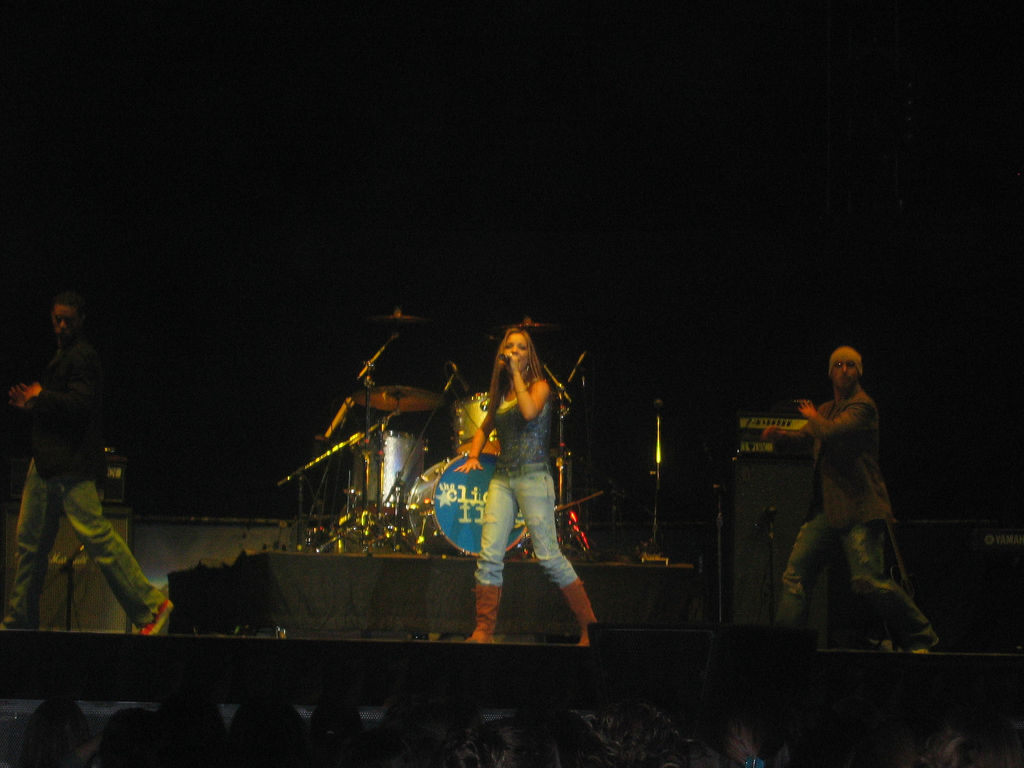

Background information
- Born: Kaci Deanne Brown; July 7, 1988 (age 38); Sulphur Springs, Texas, U.S.
- Genres: Pop, R&B, country
- Occupations: Singer, songwriter
- Instruments: Vocals, piano, guitar
- Years active: 2005–present
- Labels: Interscope (2005–08); NHMM (2016–present)

Kaci Deanne Brown (born July 7, 1988) is an American singer and songwriter. Born in Sulphur Springs, Texas, she began performing at an early age, performing across Texas and winning the title of "Little Miss Texas Overall Grand Talent" at ten years old. At age 11, she moved with her family to Nashville, Tennessee in 2001, where she quickly established herself in the country scene. She soon signed a music publishing deal as a staff songwriter with Roy and Barbara Orbison's Still Working Music, initially with the intention of developing a career in country music. She eventually chose to pursue a pop career and toured with the Backstreet Boys. At age 17, she released her debut album Instigator via Interscope Records in 2005. She co-wrote all but one of the album's songs with producer Toby Gad.

In 2016, Brown was signed to NHMM, Notting Hill Music's label. On June 23, 2017, Bone Thugs-N-Harmony released their album New Waves which features Brown on the album's fifth track, "That Girl". Brown is currently writing and performing as one half of country duo Brown & Gray, with Sam Gray. On June 30, 2017, the duo released a new single called "Top Down". She has also worked on collaborations with Brad Crisler and Leslie Satcher.

Brown has written for and contributed to numerous artists and albums, including Greyson Chance (Hold on 'Til The Night), and Pixie Lott (Turn It Up).

== Discography ==
=== Albums ===
- Instigator (2005)

=== Singles ===
Year	Single	Peak chart positions	Notes
Year	Single	US Dance	Notes
2006	"Unbelievable"	27	
2006	"Instigator"	9	
2017	"That Girl"*	N/A	Released by Bone Thugs-N-Harmony. *Featured vocalist.
2017	"Top Down"	N/A	As "Brown and Gray".
2017	"It's Not Christmas ('Til You Come Around)"	N/A	As "Brown and Gray".
