= No Regrets (Elisabeth Withers album) =

Studio album by Elisabeth Withers
- Released: September 14, 2010
- Genre: Soul, Neo-soul, R&B, Jazz
- Length: 46:50
- Label: E1
- Producer: Elisabeth Withers, Bob Perry, George Littlejohn, Russell Johnson, Damon Mendes, Bob Antoine, Clarence Blakely, Barry Eastmond, Toby Gad, Ivan & Carvin, Peter Lord

Elisabeth Withers chronology
It Can Happen to Anyone (2007)	No Regrets (2010)

No Regrets is the second studio album by American singer-songwriter Elisabeth Withers, released by E1 Records on September 14, 2010. The album features contributions by Toby Gad (who produced for her first album), Gordon Chambers, Carvin & Ivan, Barry Eastmond, Peter Lord, Clarence Blakely and Bob Antoine.

== Track listing ==
No.	Title	Composer(s)	Length
1.	"No Regrets"	Gordon Chambers, Barry Eastmond, Elisabeth Withers	3:56
2.	"Dream"	Withers, Toby Gad	3:42
3.	"I Believe"	Ivan Barias, Jean Baylor, Curt Chambers, Carvin Haggins, Leonard Stephens, Withers	3:33
4.	"Take Me Back"	Barias, Baylor, Haggins, Johnnie Smith, Withers	4:52
5.	"I Remember"	Barias, Baylor, Haggins, Withers	3:10
6.	"Need Love"	Bob Antoine, Clarence Blakely, Conya Doss	5:17
7.	"Rock & Rain"	Peter Lord Moreland	3:48
8.	"Why"	Gad, Withers	3:37
9.	"Bittersweet" (Duet with Gordon Chambers)	Chambers, Gad, Withers	3:08
10.	"Alright"	Barias, Baylor, Chambers, Eastmond, Haggins, Smith, Withers	3:36
11.	"Say It Now"	Gad, Withers	4:31
12.	"Because I Love You"	Baylor, Chambers, Eastmond	3:40

== Credits and personnel ==
The following credits are from Allmusic.

=== Management ===
- Laurel Dann – A&R
- Bob Perry – Executive producer
- George Littlejohn -Executive producer
- Russell Johnson – Executive producer
- Damon Mendes – Executive producer
- Elisabeth Withers – Executive producer
- Paul Grosso – Creative Director
- Mr. Andrew Kelley – Art direction, Design
- Karen Fuchs – Photography
- Teri Flore – Stylist
- Jayda Audrick – Stylist
- Sabrina Rowe – Make up, Hair stylist
- Mark Weiss – Make up, Hair stylist

=== Producer ===
- Bob Antoine
- Ivan "Orthodox" Barias
- Clarence Blakely
- Barry J. Eastmond
- Toby Gad
- Carvin "Ransum" Higgins
- Peter Lord
- Elisabeth Withers

=== Engineering, Mixing and Arrangement ===
- Ivan Barias – Instrumentation
- Curt Chambers – Guitar
- Gordon Chambers – Vocals, Background Vocals, Vocal Arrangement
- Jean Baylor – Arranger, Background Vocals, Vocal Producer
- Conya Doss – Background Vocals
- Barry Eastmond – Keyboards, engineer, Drum Programming
- Toby Gad – Instrumentation, engineer, Mixing
- Josh Gannet – Mixing
- Carvin Higgins – Arranger, engineer
- Ali Irvin – Engineer, Background vocals
- Kostadin Kamcev – Engineer
- Peter Lord – Instrumentation, engineer
- Arnold Mischkulnig – Mastering, Mixing
- Bob Power – Mixing
- Johnnie "Smurf" Smith – Keyboards, Instrumentation
- Leonard "E-Flat" Stephens – Keyboards
- Elisabeth Withers – Arranger, Vocals, Background Vocals, Vocal Arrangement, Vocal Producer
- Paul Shaffer – Quotation author
