= Popular (The Veronicas song) =

2008 single by the Veronicas

Single by the Veronicas

from the album Hook Me Up
- Released: 11 October 2008
- Studio: The Veronicas' living room (Los Angeles, California)
- Genre: New wave
- Length: 2:44
- Label: Sire
- Songwriters: Beni Barca; Toby Gad; Jessica Origliasso; Lisa Origliasso
- Producer: Toby Gad

The Veronicas singles chronology
"Take Me on the Floor" (2008)	"Popular" (2008)	"Lolita" (2012)

"Popular" is a song by Australian musical duo the Veronicas for their second studio album, Hook Me Up (2007). Produced by Toby Gad, it was released as the album's final single on 11 October 2008 as a digital download. Written by the Veronicas—twin sisters Lisa and Jessica Origliasso—together with Beni Barca and Toby Gad, the track was recorded in Los Angeles, California. The song pokes fun at people with privileged lifestyles.

"Popular" received mostly positive reviews from critics, who praised the fun lyrics and named it a highlight of the album. The recording was released to radio on the week of 12 October 2008 and peaked at number 11 on the Australian Airplay Chart.

== Writing and inspiration ==
"Popular" was recorded at the Origliasso's living room in Los Angeles, California, with Gad producing the track. In an interview with Cameron Adams of Herald Sun Lisa elaborated on the song's subject matter, "We wanted something different. We wanted to take the piss out of celebrity life. We thought it was hysterical." When asked about the rapped verses in the recording, Jessica replied, "I'm rapping! I'm doing it for all the unrhythmic white chicks in Australia! With a really thick Australian accent!"

== Reception ==
Emily Mackay of NME called "Popular" "plain old up-yours fun", while K. Ross Hoffman of AllMusic said the Australian accent was used to "excellent effect" in the rapped verses. Ben Norman of About.com found the lyrics "humorous" and named the track one of his favourites from the album, calling it, "Upbeat, very poppy, but eventually the complete inanity of it grew on me... Don't discount this song due to the extreme contrast it poses to the rest of the disc or their previous material. Give it a shot, you might just like it." Similarly, Nick Levine of Digital Spy declared "Popular", along with "Untouched" and "This Is How It Feels", as one of the highlights on the album. Evan Sawdey of PopMatters was impressed with the song which made for a "glorious" end to Hook Me Up, an album he felt was full of hooks. He said, "The gloriously trashy "Popular" seems fueled entirely by dance floor sweat, being both ridiculous and confident in equal measure."

David James Young of Sputnikmusic compared "Popular" to an inbred lovechild of Peaches and Princess Superstar, saying, "What can be said about this one? Basically, if Peaches went out and got completely hammered with Princess Superstar and they managed to have some kind of inbred lovechild with "Best Damn Thing"-era Avril Lavigne as the midwife, it would probably come out sounding something like this. And believe me, this is definitely not a compliment. Talking about the song, the girls say that the song is "taking the piss out of famous people". However, in a similar vein to Good Charlotte atrocity "I Just Wanna Live", you simply cannot tell and it comes off as vain and cheap." Commercially, "Popular" peaked at number 11 on the Australian Airplay Chart.

== Track listing ==
iTunes single

1. "Popular" – 2:44

== Credits and personnel ==
Credits are adapted from the Hook Me Up album liner notes.

Recording

- The Veronicas living room (Los Angeles, California)

Personnel

- Songwriting – Jessica Origliasso, Lisa Origliasso, Beni Barca, Toby Gad
- Production – Toby Gad
- Instruments and programming – Toby Gad
- Mixing – Toby Gad
- Vocals – Jessica Origliasso, Lisa Origliasso

== Charts ==
Chart (2009)	Peak position
Australian Airplay (ARIA)	11

== Release history ==
Region	Date	Format
Australia	11 October 2008	Digital download
