= Hook Me Up =

Studio album by the Veronicas
- Released: 3 November 2007
- Recorded: 2007
- Genres: Pop rock; electropop; dance-rock
- Length: 41:19
- Label: Sire
- Producers: Josh Alexander; John Feldmann; Toby Gad; Billy Steinberg; Greg Wells

The Veronicas chronology
The Secret Life Of... (2005)	Hook Me Up (2007)	The Veronicas (2014)

Alternative covers
- European/U.S. rerelease cover

Singles from Hook Me Up
- 1. "Hook Me Up" Released: 18 August 2007; 2. "Untouched" Released: 8 December 2007; 3. "This Love" Released: 10 March 2008; 4. "Popular" Released: 11 October 2008; 5. "Take Me on the Floor" Released: 13 October 2008

Hook Me Up is the second studio album by Australian duo the Veronicas, which was released on 3 November 2007 (see 2007 in music) by Sire Records. It debuted on the Australian ARIA Albums Chart at number two and has since been certified double platinum. The singles issued from the album were "Hook Me Up", "Untouched", "This Love", "Take Me on the Floor", and "Popular". For the album, the Veronicas were nominated for three awards at ARIA Music Awards of 2008: "Highest Selling Album", "Highest Selling Single", and "Best Pop Release".

== Writing and development ==
The album was mainly written and recorded in the girls' home in Los Angeles with German songwriter Toby Gad. Jessica Origliasso states "It was really great. Toby works on a simplified set-up on his Mac computer. It takes all the pressure out of being in a recording studio. We were able to take our time and get it right and not stress about time ticking." When working on the album the girls knew exactly which songwriters they wanted to work with including Billy Steinberg (who has worked with Madonna) and John Feldmann (who has worked with Good Charlotte and The Used). The songwriting saw the girls write about personal things in life mainly to do with love. The song "Revenge Is Sweeter (Than You Ever Were)" is about a person who Lisa Origliasso dated overseas, she states "When it comes down to it, that song's about cheating. A lot of people have been through it, like I've been through it, so it was very easy to relate to that situation. And I saw that whole situation go on, so it wasn't hard to write that song with her." Another personal song includes "In Another Life", is the most emotional song they've ever written. Lisa states that "While recording this song we couldn't sing it properly because we were bawling our eyes out". Jess says, "You actually hear me sniffing in the background".

In the song "Take Me on the Floor", the girls state that they "want to kiss a girl". Lisa states "Yeah, there's a sexual undertone to that song, but when we were writing it we were thinking about having fun, going to a club, being on the dancefloor. You can interpret it how you like." Jessica stated:

It would have been so easy to have made a record just like the first, with unison voices on the verse and chorus. It worked for us on the first record; it became a trademark sound. Not degrading it, we loved it, but at some point you have to grow as an artist or you get stuck.

According to Lisa:

We made that record [The Secret Life Of...] two years ago. It would be so dated to do it again. I feel we're staying current but staying ourselves. It was a natural progression. We wanted a challenge, to take it somewhere new. People had become used to our sound. Other artists released that sound using songs we'd written. We get asked, "Did you get pushed into this sound?" We were doing the pushing!

== Critical reception and commercial performance ==
Professional ratings
Review scores
Source	Rating
About.com	5/5 stars
Allmusic	4.5/5 stars
CHARTattack	2.5/5 stars
TheCelebrityCafe	7.5/10 stars
Herald Sun	(positive)
NME	7/10 stars
PopMatters	7/10 stars
Time Off	2.5/5 stars
Tommy2.net	4/4 stars
TV Hits	4/5 stars

K. Ross Hoffman of Allmusic gave the album a positive review, stating that the band "decided to take a page from the t.A.T.u. playbook". Hoffman praised that the album "is an improvement upon its predecessor in almost every regard, consolidating its strengths while making bold and exploratory forward leaps that verge on a wholesale stylistic reinvention." He states the songs at their core are "expertly crafted pop/rock tunes" and anyone who enjoyed their previous studio album would "embrace this album". Hoffman ends the review stating that the album is the "finest teen pop releases of the year." Cameron Adams of The Herald Sun also gave the album a positive review, stating that "this is one twisted, subversive pop album." He also states "It's not as laden with obvious hits as their debut, and takes more risks than most young pop stars would. In a word: brash."

Hook Me Up was commercially successful in Australia and New Zealand. In November 2007, it debuted at number two on the Australian ARIA Albums Chart with sales of 9,531 copies. The album certified gold in its first week and was kept off the top spot by The Eagles album Long Road Out of Eden (2007). The album dropped off the chart after eleven months, spending a total of fifty-one weeks in the top fifty. The Australian Recording Industry Association awarded the album double platinum certification for shipping 140,000 copies and became the twenty-eighth highest selling album in Australia for 2007. At the 2008 ARIA Awards, the album was nominated for "Highest Selling Album" and "Best Pop Release" but lost both awards to Delta by Delta Goodrem and Lessons to Be Learned by Gabriella Cilmi respectively. In New Zealand, the album debuted at number thirty-two on the New Zealand Albums Chart, and went to peak at number eight, spending a total of twenty-six weeks on the chart. The RMNZ certified the album platinum.

The album made its first appearance on the U.S. Billboard charts on 13 September 2008 at number eleven on the Billboard Top Heatseekers chart. It then went to debut on the Billboard 200 on 17 January 2009 at number one hundred and forty-seven, and peaked at number one hundred and seven. It has spent fourteen weeks on the chart. The album was certified gold by the Recording Industry Association of America on August 8, 2024. Hook Me Up also peaked at number one hundred and thirty-four on the French Albums Chart where it spent two weeks on the chart.

== Singles ==
"Hook Me Up" was released as the album's lead single on 22 September 2007. The single made its debut at number five and after seven weeks on the charts made its peak at number-one making it their first number-one hit The song received an ARIA Music Award nomination for Highest Selling Single in 2008 but lost to Gabriella Cilmi.

"Untouched" was released as the second single in Australia and as the lead single in New Zealand, North America and Europe. It was received well peaking at number two in Australia and making their Billboard Hot 100 debut in the charts peaking at number twelve. It also peaked at number nine in New Zealand, number eight in the UK and became their first number one hit, outside of Australia, in Ireland. The song was also nominated for the ARIA Music Award for Highest Selling Single.

"This Love" was released as the third single in Australia and second single in New Zealand. The single reached number ten in Australia and number fourteen in New Zealand.

"Take Me on the Floor" was released as the fourth single in Australia, the third single in New Zealand and the second single in the United States and Canada. In Australia it became their fourth consecutive top ten hit from the album peaking at number seven. It also peaked at number twenty-nine in New Zealand, number fifty-four in Canada. and number eighty-one in the US.

"Popular" was released as the fifth single in Australia. The single only received airplay and didn't chart on the ARIA Charts Top 50 singles but peaked at number eleven on the Australian Airplay Chart.

"4ever" was released as the album's second single in the UK and Ireland and re-released as the third single in the US. The single has so far peaked at number 17 in the UK and number 20 in Ireland.

== Promotion ==
The Veronicas made several TV appearances around the world to promote the album including So You Think You Can Dance in Australia and the United States and on Australian TV series Neighbours and Rove. The Veronicas also performed and they were presenters with Ashley Tisdale at the Z100 Jingle Ball on 13 December 2008 due to their success on the station and co-hosted MTV's New Year's Eve party with Miley Cyrus. While in Europe they performed on BBC Radio 1 Live Lounge, GMTV, Capital FM, TRL Italy and they will perform at the Capital FM Jingle Bell Ball

They have also filmed an episode of 90210 called Zero Tolerance where they performed Untouched and also performed the song at the Miss USA 2009 pageant. "Untouched," alongside their songs "Popular" and "Revenge Is Sweeter (Than You Ever Were)" have all appeared on the reality series The Hills.

The album received further promotion when they embarked on their Hook Me Up Tour in 2007 and Revenge Is Sweeter tour in 2009 They were also supposed to tour with Morningwood in 2009, but the tour fell through.

== Track listing ==
No.	Title	Writer(s)	Producer(s)	Length
1.	"Untouched"	Toby Gad; Jessica Origliasso; Lisa Origliasso	Gad	4:14
2.	"Hook Me Up"	Greg Wells; Shelly Peiken; J. Origliasso; L. Origliasso	Wells	2:56
3.	"This Is How It Feels"	Gad; J. Origliasso; L. Origliasso	Gad	4:12
4.	"This Love"	Gad; Kesha Sebert	Gad	2:59
5.	"I Can't Stay Away"	Josh Alexander; Billy Steinberg	Alexander; Steinberg	3:26
6.	"Take Me on the Floor"	Gad; J. Origliasso; L. Origliasso	Gad	3:30
7.	"I Don't Wanna Wait"	John Feldmann; J. Origliasso; L. Origliasso	Feldmann	2:59
8.	"Popular"	Gad; J. Origliasso; L. Origliasso; Beni Barca	Gad	2:44
9.	"Revenge Is Sweeter (Than You Ever Were)"	Gad; J. Origliasso; L. Origliasso	Gad	3:42
10.	"Someone Wake Me Up"	Alexander; Steinberg; J. Origliasso; L. Origliasso	Alexander; Steinberg	3:33
11.	"All I Have"	Gad; J. Origliasso; L. Origliasso	Gad	3:12
12.	"In Another Life"	Gad; J. Origliasso; L. Origliasso	Gad	3:47
Total length:				41:16

2008 re-release bonus track
No.	Title	Writer(s)	Producer(s)	Length
13.	"Goodbye to You"	Zackery Holt Smith	Gad	3:12
Total length:				44:28

2009 re-release bonus tracks
No.	Title	Writer(s)	Producer(s)	Length
14.	"Change the World"	Feldmann; J. Origliasso; L. Origliasso	Feldmann	3:07
15.	"4ever"	Max Martin; Lukasz "Dr. Luke" Gottwald	Martin; Gottwald	3:28

UK re-release bonus track
No.	Title	Writer(s)	Producer(s)	Length
16.	"Everything I'm Not"	Martin; Rami; Gottwald; J. Origliasso; L. Origliasso	Martin; Rami; Gottwald	3:21

US 2009 iTunes Store bonus tracks
No.	Title	Writer(s)	Producer(s)	Length
16.	"Everything"	J. Origliasso; L. Origliasso; Robert J. Guariglia; Paul De Vincenzo; Jungle George; Vik Foxx	Gad; Guariglia	3:20
17.	"Don't Say Goodbye" (featuring Tania Doko)	J. Origliasso; L. Origliasso; Gad; Tania Doko	Gad	2:54
18.	"Untouched" (Listen Deep Remix)	Gad; J. Origliasso; L. Origliasso	Gad	4:32
19.	"Untouched" (music video)			3:43

== Personnel ==
The Veronicas

- Jessica Origliasso – lead vocals, background vocals, writer, main artist
- Lisa Origliasso – lead vocals, background vocals, writer, main artist

Additional personnel

- Jeff Aldrich – A&R
- Josh Alexander – digital editing, production, recording, keyboard, programming, guitar
- Matt Appleton – engineering
- Joel Bajrech – logo design
- Dean Butterworth – drums
- Donny Campion – beats
- John Feldmann – engineering, production, mixing, guitar, bass, keys, string arrangement, percussion
- Jens Gad – drums
- Toby Gad – mixing, instruments, mastering
- Chris Garcia – digital editing
- Brian "Big Bass" Gardner – mastering
- Gersh – drum tech
- Michael Goldstone – A&R
- Nick Haussling – A&R Coordinator
- Brandon Kilgour – mixing
- Steve Martin – programming
- Kyle Moorman – engineering
- Erik Ron – engineering
- Carlotta Moye – photography
- Drew Pearson – recording
- Scott Roewe – Pro Tools, logic tech
- Dave Russell – mixing
- Billy Steinberg – production
- Stuart Stuart – vocal production
- Stephen Walker – design
- Fabien Waltmann – programming
- Greg Wells – production, mixing, programming, piano, beats

== Charts ==
=== Weekly charts ===
Chart (2007–09)	Peak position
Australian Albums (ARIA)	2
Canadian Albums (Billboard)	57
French Albums (SNEP)	134
Irish Albums (IRMA)	33
Mexican Albums (Top 100 Mexico)	47
New Zealand Albums (RMNZ)	8
Scottish Albums (Official Charts)	25
UK Albums (Official Charts)	35
US Billboard 200	107
US Heatseekers Albums (Billboard)	1

=== Year-end charts ===
Chart (2007)	Peak position
Australian Albums (ARIA)	28

Chart (2008)	Peak position
Australian Albums (ARIA)	17
New Zealand Albums (RMNZ)	41

== Certifications ==
Certifications for Hook Me Up
Region	Certification	Certified units/sales
Australia (ARIA)	2× Platinum	140,000^{^}
New Zealand (RMNZ)	Platinum	15,000^{‡}
United States (RIAA)	Gold	500,000^{‡}
^{^} Shipments figures based on certification alone.^{‡} Sales+streaming figures based on certification alone.

== Release history ==
The album was made available for pre-order on the Australian iTunes Music Store on 16 October 2007. It includes a digital booklet, the music video for the single "Hook Me Up" and a track by track commentary by the Veronicas. It was released as a compact disc in Australia on 3 November 2007. The group recently posted a message on their Myspace page stating that the album will be released in the U.S. in May 2008. It was added to pre-order on iTunes, where it release was stated to 13 May, with a bonus track, a cover of Scandal's "Goodbye to You." In June 2008, it was added to Amazon on the "First to know," and it means a physical release on the U.S. Fansite lovetheveronicas.com reports that the album will have a physical CD release on 16 September 2008.

In a recent YouTube message, the Veronicas confirmed that the U.S. release of Hook Me Up has been pushed up and is now going to release on 26 August 2008. The clean version of the American release was released on 9 September In America, a recent YAZ Birth Control Commercial uses the track "Goodbye to You." The UK release was originally scheduled for 22 June, but was bumped back to 21 September, then again to 5 October, after the Veronicas announced plans to release a second UK single, "4ever" following the success of "Untouched".

Region	Date	Label	Format	Catalogue
Australia	3 November 2007	Sire Records	CD, digital download	9362499015
New Zealand	7 April 2008	Warner Bros. Records	CD, digital download	9362499154
Chile	12 May 2008	Sire Records	CD, digital download	
Canada	20 January 2009	Sire Records	CD	2395260
United States	13 May 2008	Sire Records	Digital download	395260
United States	26 August 2008	Sire Records	CD	395260
United States	9 June 2009	Sire Records	Re-issue CD	395260
Brazil	27 March 2009	Warner Music	CD	9362498923
Japan	14 April 2009	Pony Canyon	CD	
Italy	3 April 2009	Warner Music	CD	
France	6 April 2009	Warner Music	CD	
Mexico	23 June 2009	Warner Music	CD	093624989233
UK	12 October 2009	Warner Music	CD, digital download	9362497101
Australia	November 2019	Warner Music	LP	0349784862
Australia	November 2024	Warner Music	LP (RSD)	RCV1 315132
