= Elisabeth Withers =

American singer

- Also known as: Elle Patrice
- Born: February 27, 1970 (age 56); Joliet, Illinois, US
- Genres: Neo soul, R&B, jazz
- Occupations: Singer, songwriter
- Label: Blue Note Records

Elisabeth Withers is an American neo soul and R&B singer-songwriter.

== Biography ==
Withers was born in Joliet, Illinois, and studied at the Berklee College of Music and then at New York University. She sang as a backup vocalist for Celine Dion and Jennifer Lopez, among others, and released several dance singles under the name Elle Patrice, including "Rising" and "Emotions". After hearing these singles, Nick Ashford asked her to audition for a Broadway production of The Color Purple, where she won the part of Shug Avery. Her performance earned her a Tony Award for Best Featured Actress in a Musical nomination at the 60th Tony Awards. As a neo soul singer, Withers signed with Blue Note Records in 2005. In 2007, she released a full-length album on Blue Note Records. She performed on the PBS television show Between the Lions, a puppet educational show as a member of Fonix, singing backup and leading vocals.

== Discography ==
Studio albums

- It Can Happen to Anyone (2007)
- No Regrets (2010)

Singles

- "Be With You" (2006) U.S. R&B No. 43
- "Simple Things" (2007) U.S. R&B No. 53
