= Take Me on the Floor =

2008 single by the Veronicas

Single by the Veronicas

from the album Hook Me Up
- Released: 13 October 2008
- Genre: Electropop; dance; electronic rock; proto-recession pop
- Length: 3:30 (album version); 2:48 (Australian video)
- Label: Sire
- Songwriters: Toby Gad; Jessica Origliasso; Lisa Origliasso
- Producer: Toby Gad

The Veronicas singles chronology
"This Love" (2008)	"Take Me on the Floor" (2008)	"Popular" (2008)

The Veronicas US singles chronology
"Untouched" (2008)	"Take Me on the Floor" (2009)	"4ever" (2009)

"Take Me on the Floor" is a song by the Veronicas from their second album, Hook Me Up. It was released as the fourth single from the album in Australia as a digital download on 13 October 2008. In the US Warner Bros. hosted a poll for fans to vote through texting to decide which should be the second single in the US; "Take Me on the Floor" was then announced as the next single on their YouTube page and was released on 24 March 2009 to radio. The song was used in promotional ads for the 2008 season of Australia's Dancing with the Stars. A remix of "Take Me on the Floor" was later made featuring Pitbull.

== Writing and inspiration ==
The song was written by Toby Gad, Jessica Origliasso and Lisa Origliasso. Several lines of "Take Me on the Floor", specifically "I wanna kiss a girl, I wanna kiss a girl, I wanna kiss a boy", caused some controversy for its portrayal of sexuality. The video also stirred up controversy, as it depicts kissing scenes between girls. Lisa states "Yeah, I reckon there's a sexual undertone to that song, but when we were writing it we were thinking about having fun, going to a club, being on the dancefloor. You can interpret it how you like."

== Music and structure ==
"Take Me on the Floor"
"Take Me on the Floor" has '80s-influenced techno synths and techno-dance beat made by synthesizer keyboard, synthesized drums, and guitars.

"Take Me on the Floor" is an uptempo electropop-dance song. The song is set in Common time with an energy filled fast tempo of 138 beats per minute. The song is written in the key of E minor. The song begins with techno synths playing followed by breathy vocal, then progresses into fast tempo techno-dance beat played by guitars, synthesizer keyboards, and synthesized Tr-808 drums. Lisa and Jess's vocal range spans from A_{3}-E_{5}.

Lyrically, the song is about having fun on the dancefloor. The song is also the first song to feature screams, which are performed by Jessica.

== Critical reception ==
Chris Williams of Billboard gave the song a positive review, stating "Their second single "Take Me on the Floor" finds the girls collaborating with writer/producer Toby Gad ("Big Girls Don't Cry") for an arresting, festive slice of dance/pop. A subdued vocal and synth intro bursts into the kind of electronica groove currently in favor thanks to Lady GaGa. The Veronicas concoct a club anthem whose lyrics and video may raise an eyebrow, surely with the hope of continued teen pop momentum for their second album, "Hook Me Up"." Epinions call the song a delivery of the most radio friendly disco, new wave and rock saying it would be a great song to just let go to in the dance clubs. Sheena Lyonais of CHARTAttack calls Take Me on the Floor "admittedly pure teenage party tracks, but impossible to respect"

== Chart performance ==
"Take Me on the Floor" peaked at number seven in its second week of release on the Australian ARIA Singles Chart. In its ninth week, it was certified Gold (35,000+ sales) on digital downloads alone. It is their fourth consecutive single from Hook Me Up to reach top 10 in Australia. In the US, the single debuted on the Billboard Pop 100 chart at number 97, and peaked at number 81 on the Billboard Hot 100.

== Music video ==
=== Australian version ===
The official music video for "Take Me on the Floor" premiered on 13 August 2008 on the Hot 30 Countdown website. The video begins with Lisa surrounded by lights singing in a club while everyone is dancing. Then both girls start singing the chorus of the song while in front of a blue background. It then shows a man walking into the club. After the chorus, Jess starts singing in front of a red window with Mandarin Chinese writing on it. It occasionally shows scenes with Lisa singing in front of the same backdrop throughout the verse. In the third verse, Jess finds a woman to dance with, and Lisa finds a man. Throughout the last chorus, it shows them with the men and woman dancing in the same club shown at the start. The song ends with both girls standing in front of the blue background again.

Throughout the video it cuts to scenes where everyone is dancing as well as them singing in front of the lights and a red Mandarin Chinese backdrop, as well as several people kissing. Controversy arose when sections in the music video depicted two women making out in a mock doggy style position.

=== International version ===
The international version of the music video was a live version shot on 24 February 2009 at the Palais Theatre in Melbourne on the Australian leg of the Revenge Is Sweeter tour. The video was released on their website on 1 May 2009.

== Track listing ==
iTunes single

1. "Take Me on the Floor" (Toby Gad, Jessica Origliasso, Lisa Origliasso) – 3:30

== Charts ==
=== Weekly charts ===
Chart (2008–2010)	Peak position
Australia (ARIA)	7
Canada Hot 100 (Billboard)	54
Czech Republic Airplay (ČNS IFPI)	11
New Zealand (Recorded Music NZ)	29
US Billboard Hot 100	81
US Pop 100 (Billboard)	73

=== Year end charts ===
Chart (2008)	Position
Australia (ARIA)	53

== Certification ==
Region	Certification	Certified units/sales
Australia (ARIA)	Gold	35,000^{^}
^{^} Shipments figures based on certification alone.

== Release history ==
Region	Date	Label	Format
Australia	13 October 2008	Sire	Digital download
United States	24 March 2009	Warner Bros.	Airplay
