= This Love (The Veronicas song) =

2008 single by the Veronicas

Single by the Veronicas

from the album Hook Me Up
- B-side: "Don't Say Goodbye"
- Released: 10 March 2008
- Genre: Dance-rock
- Length: 2:59
- Label: Sire
- Songwriters: Toby Gad; Kesha Sebert
- Producer: Toby Gad

The Veronicas singles chronology
"Untouched" (2007)	"This Love" (2008)	"Take Me on the Floor" (2008)

Alternative cover
- Digital single cover

"This Love" is a dance-rock song written by Toby Gad and a then-unknown Kesha, produced by Gad for Australian musical duo the Veronicas' second album, Hook Me Up (2007). It was released as the album's third single in Australia as a digital download on 30 March 2008 and CD single 14 April 2008. The song became a top-10 hit in Australia and top-20 hit in New Zealand, peaking at numbers 10 and 14, respectively. AllMusic called "This Love" "an utterly charming dance-rock confection that, in its last minute, abruptly unleashes a euphoric synthesizer countermelody whose nod to a-ha's 'Take On Me' is unmissable."

== Music video ==
The music video for the song was filmed at The Storrier in Potts Point, Australia, and took one week to film various scenes around Sydney. The video premiered on Australian music channels on 25 March 2008. It features two males playing each of the Veronicas' partners, including ex-Australian Idol contestant Dean Geyer as one of them (Lisa Origliasso's partner, whom she was also dating at the time). The Veronicas state that they included their real life boyfriends in the video to show a more real side to their relationships.

== Commercial performance ==
"This Love" experienced commercial success in Australia and New Zealand. In late April 2008, it debuted at number 14 on the Australian ARIA Singles Chart. During its fifth week on the chart, it peaked at number 10 and went on to spend five months on the chart. The Australian Recording Industry Association awarded the single a gold certification for shipping 35,000 copies. In New Zealand, the single debuted at number 37 on the RIANZ Singles Chart and peaked at number 14, spending a total of 14 weeks on the chart.

== Track listing ==
CD single and digital single

1. "This Love" – 2:59
2. "Don't Say Goodbye" (featuring Tania Doko) – 2:56
3. "Untouched" (Listen Deep remix) – 4:32

== Charts ==
=== Weekly charts ===
Chart (2008)	Peak position
Australia (ARIA)	10
New Zealand (Recorded Music NZ)	14

=== Year-end charts ===
Chart (2008)	Position
Australia (ARIA)	60

== Certifications ==
Region	Certification	Certified units/sales
Australia (ARIA)	Gold	35,000^{^}
^{^} Shipments figures based on certification alone.

== Release history ==
Region	Date	Label	Format	Catalog
Australia	10 March 2008	Sire	Digital download	9362498706
Australia	14 April 2008	Sire	CD single	9362498706
