= Untouched (song) =

2007 single by the Veronicas

Single by the Veronicas

from the album Hook Me Up
- B-side: "Hollywood"
- Released: 8 December 2007
- Genre: Electropop; power pop
- Length: 4:14 (album version); 3:21 (radio edit); 3:41 (video edit)
- Label: Sire
- Songwriters: Toby Gad; Jessica Origliasso; Lisa Origliasso
- Producer: Toby Gad

The Veronicas singles chronology
| "Hook Me Up" (2007) | "Untouched" (2007) | "This Love" (2008) |

The Veronicas UK singles chronology
| "Untouched" (2009) | "4ever" (2009) |

The Veronicas US singles chronology
| "When It All Falls Apart" (2006) | "Untouched" (2008) | "Take Me on the Floor" (2009) |

"Untouched" is a song by Australian duo the Veronicas from their second studio album, Hook Me Up (2007). Toby Gad assisted the duo in writing the song and also produced it. It was released as the second single from the band's album in Australia on 10 December 2007, and as the first single in the UK and US.

"Untouched" received generally positive reviews from music critics, who applauded the departure from their previous music, with some highlighting it as the album's standout track and comparing it to the work of Pink and Avril Lavigne. The song was commercially successful worldwide, as the song reached number seventeen on the U.S. Billboard Hot 100, becoming the group's only top twenty there and was known as their breakthrough single. The song also peaked at number eight in the United Kingdom, number two in their native Australia, number nine in New Zealand and at number one in Ireland. The song was certified double platinum by Recording Industry Association of America (RIAA) for shipments exceeding one million.

An accompanying music video was released for the single, directed by Anthony Rose, where it was shot in Sydney, Australia. The song was featured in 90210 and has been nominated for several awards, including Highest Selling Single at the ARIA Music Awards and Favorite Song at the Nickelodeon Australian Kids' Choice Awards. In 2025, the song was voted third on the Triple J Hottest 100 of Australian Songs poll.

== Background and composition ==
"Untouched" was written by the Veronicas twins Jessica Origliasso and Lisa Origliasso along with Toby Gad, the track's producer. Writing and recording of the song took place at Jessica and Lisa's home in Los Angeles, California. The song relates to Jessica and Lisa's feelings of separation from loved ones. In an interview with Rachel Jones of Female First, Lisa explained the theme of "Untouched": "It's about not physically being able to touch someone or be with them but kind of needing that person".

"Untouched" is an electropop and power pop song set in common time with an energy-filled fast tempo of 176 beats per minute. The song is written in the key of F-sharp minor. The song begins with strings, which are sometimes performed by a real string section in live performances, followed by guitars and synthesized drums. Lisa and Jess's vocal ranges span from A_{3}-E_{5}.

== Critical reception ==
Ben Norman from About.com said "'Untouched' is fast, both in BPM and in the way the twins vocally present the song, yet it proves once again that speed and pain are not mutually exclusive ideas." K. Ross Hoffman from AllMusic had highlighted the track as an album standout, saying "'Untouched' bursts out of the gate with majestic, menacing string stabs and a driving synth-rock pulse beneath its stuttered verses and breathlessly obsessive refrain." Emily Mackay from NME gave it a positive remark from the album review as she described the song as "raunchy". Evan Sawdey from PopMatters highlighted "Untouched" as a standout, saying "some of the best tracks the girls have ever made, some of which ('Untouched', 'Revenge Is Sweeter'/) even outclass previous high points like Secret Life's flawless anthem "When It All Falls Apart."

David Balls from Digital Spy gave it three stars out of five. He said "Though it's been knocking about for a while, it's 'Untouched' that The Veronicas are touting as their breakthrough single over here." He concluded saying "There's little in the way of originality here, but the girls' vampish style and quirky charm should work in their favour." He had compared the song to the music of Pink and Avril Lavigne. FemaleFirst.co.uk gave the song four-and-a-half out of five stars, saying "Other than that, this looks set to be an epic dance floor tune over the summer of 2009, it’s definitely finding a place on my iPod that’s for sure!".

The song was also in the 2008 football video game FIFA 09

In 2025 the song was voted third in the Triple J Hottest 100 of Australian Songs.

== Chart and commercial performance ==
In their native Australia, the song debuted at number four, and rose to its peak of number two a week later. It remained there for three consecutive weeks, and stayed in the top ten for thirteen weeks and in the charts for a total of 29 weeks. It was certified Platinum by Australian Recording Industry Association (ARIA) for selling over 70,000 copies there, and ranked at numbers 78 and 21 on the ARIA Top 100 Singles lists for 2007 and 2008, respectively. The song debuted at number 34 on the New Zealand Singles Chart and peaked at number nine, charting for a total of 29 weeks and was certified 2× Platinum by Recorded Music NZ (RMNZ), shipping over 60,000 copies there.

"Untouched" made its debut on the US Billboard charts at number 16 on the Bubbling Under Hot 100 chart, but dropped off the charts the week after. It would make its debut on the Billboard Hot 100 at number 62 on the chart dated 13 December 2008 due to rising radio play, and became the Veronicas' first Hot 100 entry. The song entered the top forty two weeks later at number 40, and peaked at number 17 on the week dated 7 February 2009, making it the duo's first and only top 20 hit in the US. It was present on the chart for a total of 20 weeks, spending its final week on the chart at number 81 on the week dated 25 April 2009. The single has since been certified 2× Platinum by the Recording Industry Association of America, for sales of over two million units in the US. In neighbouring Canada, the song entered the Canadian Hot 100 at number 68 in June 2008, but dropped to number 88 a week later and fell off the chart the following week. It re-entered the chart for one week at number 97 in November, but fell off again the week after. For the week dated 20 December 2008, "Untouched" re-entered the Canadian Hot 100 at number 85, climbing to a new peak of number 59 the following week. Nine weeks later, it entered the top ten at number eight, becoming the group's first top ten hit there, and peaked at number five in its seventeenth week. It spent a total of two weeks in the top ten, and was present on the chart for 24 weeks.

After being previewed on BBC Radio 1 before release by Scott Mills, the song was playlisted on the station at "A-list", leading to "Untouched" debuting on the UK Singles Chart at number 92. "Untouched" received an "MTV Push" and large amounts of airplay on music channels when it was officially released on 25 May 2009. In the week ending 31 May, "Untouched" re-entered the chart at a new peak of number eight, marking the duo's first top ten in the country. It stayed in the top ten for five consecutive weeks and charted for a total of 24 non-consecutive weeks, and has since been certified Platinum by the British Phonographic Industry (BPI), denoting sales equivalent to 600,000 units. In Ireland, the song initially entered the Irish Singles Chart at number 38, but fell off before re-entering at number two three weeks later. After two weeks at number two, in the week dated 12 June 2009 "Untouched" climbed to the top of the Irish Singles Chart, making "Untouched" The Veronicas' first number-one single outside of Australia. It spent one week at number one and eight consecutive weeks in the top ten, and was present on the chart for 15 weeks, eventually earning a Platinum certification in the country.

== Music video ==
The music video for the song was filmed at the Marble Bar in Sydney's Hilton Building and it took eighteen hours to film with fifty extras dressed in gothic glamour. The video starts with a lot of pictures in the hallway. It goes to the band performing with a crowd in front of them. Jess and Lisa are in the hallway singing. They meet a man later. In the chorus, Jess and Lisa perform with the rest of the group. Jess is hanging around with the man and after a while, she goes to get something. The man then sees Lisa walking around in the crowd, and, since they are twins, he thinks that she is Jess. So he follows her and brings her back to the couch where he was sitting. In a little bit, Jess comes back to the couch. She sees that the man is kissing Lisa, and is offended. They see that he is trying to make a move with both of them, so together, they walk away. The music video was released on 3 December 2007 to Australian music channel shows. The video made its debut on MTV's TRL as a first look on 9 July 2008, and a week later made its debut on the countdown at number 10.

== Live performance ==
The Veronicas performed the song live at the ARIA Music Awards in 2008. The Veronicas also performed the song live at the Miss USA 2009 pageant. In March 2026 The Veronicas performed "Untouched" live for the youth radio station Triple J's Like a Version weekly music program.

== Track listings ==
iTunes single

1. "Untouched" – 4:14

CD single

1. "Untouched" – 4:14
2. "Hollywood" – 3:46
3. "Hook Me Up" (Tommy Trash remix) – 2:53

iTunes EP "Lost Tracks"

1. "Untouched" – 4:14
2. "Untouched" (acoustic) – 3:39
3. "Hollywood" – 3:46
4. "Insomnia" – 3:22
5. "Everything" – 3:28

Remixes EP

1. "Untouched" (Eddie Amador remix edit) – 4:47
2. "Untouched" (Napack - Dangerous Muse remix edit) – 4:52
3. "Untouched" (Designers Drugs remix edit) – 4:49
4. "Untouched" (Von Doom radio) – 4:07

== Charts ==
=== Weekly charts ===
| Chart (2007–2009) | Peak position |
|---|---|
| Australia (ARIA) | 2 |
| Austria (Ö3 Austria Top 40) | 23 |
| Belgium (Ultratip Bubbling Under Flanders) | 12 |
| Canada Hot 100 (Billboard) | 5 |
| Canada CHR/Top 40 (Billboard) | 10 |
| Canada Hot AC (Billboard) | 11 |
| Czech Republic Airplay (ČNS IFPI) | 3 |
| Finland Download (Latauslista) | 10 |
| Germany (GfK) | 48 |
| Hungary (Rádiós Top 40) | 27 |
| Ireland (IRMA) | 1 |
| Mexico (Billboard Ingles Airplay) | 4 |
| Netherlands (Dutch Top 40) | 5 |
| Netherlands (Single Top 100) | 36 |
| New Zealand (Recorded Music NZ) | 9 |
| Slovakia Airplay (ČNS IFPI) | 89 |
| Switzerland (Schweizer Hitparade) | 34 |
| UK Singles (Official Charts) | 8 |
| US Billboard Hot 100 | 17 |
| US Adult Pop Airplay (Billboard) | 22 |
| US Pop Airplay (Billboard) | 12 |

=== Year-end charts ===
| Chart (2007) | Position |
|---|---|
| Australia (ARIA) | 78 |

| Chart (2008) | Position |
|---|---|
| Australia (ARIA) | 21 |
| New Zealand (RIANZ) | 34 |

| Chart (2009) | Position |
|---|---|
| Brazil (Crowley) | 88 |
| Canada (Canadian Hot 100) | 52 |
| Hungary (Rádiós Top 40) | 120 |
| Netherlands (Dutch Top 40) | 36 |
| UK Singles (OCC) | 69 |
| US Billboard Hot 100 | 69 |

=== Decade-end charts ===
| Chart (2000–2009) | Position |
|---|---|
| Australia (ARIA) | 79 |
| Australian Artist (ARIA) | 13 |

== Certifications ==
| Region | Certification | Certified units/sales |
|---|---|---|
| Australia (ARIA) | Platinum | 70,000^{^} |
| Ireland (IRMA) | Platinum | 15,000^{^} |
| New Zealand (RMNZ) | 2× Platinum | 60,000^{‡} |
| United Kingdom (BPI) | Platinum | 600,000^{‡} |
| United States (RIAA) | 2× Platinum | 2,000,000^{‡} |
^{^} Shipments figures based on certification alone.^{‡} Sales+streaming figures based on certification alone.

== Release history ==
| Region | Date | Label | Format(s) | Catalogue | Ref. |
|---|---|---|---|---|---|
| United States | 8 December 2007 | Sire | Digital download | | |
| United States | 15 April 2008 | Sire | Airplay | | |
| United States | 13 May 2008 | Sire | Airplay | | |
| Australia | 8 December 2007 | Sire | CD; digital download | 9362498882 | |
| Chile | 8 December 2007 | Sire | Digital download | | |
| United States | August 2008 | Sire | Airplay | | |
| France | 30 March 2009 | Sire | CD; digital download | B001TEKHBI | |
| Ireland | 22 May 2009 | Sire | CD; digital download | | |
| United Kingdom | 25 May 2009 | Sire | CD; digital download | | |
