= Pressure (Tyler Bryant & the Shakedown album) =

Studio album by Tyler Bryant & the Shakedown
- Released: October 16, 2020
- Recorded: April 20–May 29, 2020; March 27, 2020
- Studio: The Bombay Palace, Nashville
- Genre: Hard rock; blues rock
- Length: 42:40
- Label: Snakefarm
- Producer: Tyler Bryant & the Shakedown; Roger Alan Nichols

Tyler Bryant & the Shakedown chronology
| Truth and Lies (2019) | Pressure (2020) | Shake the Roots (2022) |

Singles from Pressure
- 1. "Crazy Days" Released: August 14, 2020; 2. "Holdin' My Breath" Released: September 18, 2020

Pressure is the fourth studio album by American rock band Tyler Bryant & the Shakedown. It was released on October 16, 2020.

== Background and recording ==
Following the success of their previous album, Tyler Bryant & the Shakedown planned to tour France, which was to be followed by a tour with Nickelback and Stone Temple Pilots scheduled for summer 2020. However, with the sudden onset of the COVID-19 pandemic in March 2020, those plans were put on hold, and the group remained in Nashville. It was also around this time that bassist Noah Denney announced his decision to leave the group. All of these events led Bryant to write the song “Crazy Days”, which he recorded with his wife, Rebecca Lovell of Larkin Poe, at their home studio, the Bombay Palace.

“Crazy Days” wound up in the hands of Bryant's label, Spinefarm Records, who contacted Bryant and suggested he record a new album at his home studio during lockdown. Bryant agreed, and asked friend and producer Roger Alan Nichols to help engineer and co-produce the new record. Recording sessions for the album began at the Bombay Palace on April 20, 2020, with Graham Whitford and Caleb Crosby joining Bryant in the studio. Also recording with the band was bassist Ryan Fitzgerald, who had joined the group following Denney’s departure.

Throughout the sessions for the album, Bryant was troubled by personal problems as well as lack of sleep. As a result, he displayed erratic behavior throughout recording, clashing with other band members, and suffering from mental breakdowns. By the time sessions wrapped on May 8, Bryant was physically and mentally exhausted from recording.

== Release and reception ==
“Crazy Days” was released as a single with the album’s announcement on August 14, 2020. On September 18, “Holdin’ My Breath” was released. The single featured Blackberry Smoke member Charlie Starr, who had recorded his vocals for the track on May 29. Throughout the build-up to the release of Pressure, Ryan Fitzgerald’s addition to the group was kept a secret, with him not appearing in any photoshoots or other promotional materials. It was only after the album's release on October 16 that Fitzgerald was revealed in a prerecorded live music video of the group performing several tracks from the album. However, no official music videos were produced for any of the songs on the album.

Upon its release, Pressure was highly revered by Blues Rock Review, which regarded it as the group's best release thus far, giving it a score of 9.5/10 and praising as "blues rock in its essence, with melodic vocals, powerful guitar riffs, firm drum beats, and cohesive bass lines". Ghost Cult gave the album a 9/10, claiming that Pressure "follow[ed] the roller coaster that is 2020 life". Classic Rock gave the album 4 out of 5 stars, a rating which was also given by Cryptic Rock.

== Track listing ==
| No. | Title | Length |
|---|---|---|
| 1. | "Pressure" | 2:24 |
| 2. | "Hitchhiker (Don't Give The Devil A Ride)" | 3:22 |
| 3. | "Crazy Days" | 3:49 |
| 4. | "Backbone" | 2:48 |
| 5. | "Holdin' My Breath" | 4:12 |
| 6. | "Like The Old Me" | 3:51 |
| 7. | "Automatic" | 2:54 |
| 8. | "Wildside" | 3:22 |
| 9. | "Misery" | 3:34 |
| 10. | "Fuel" | 2:49 |
| 11. | "Loner" | 3:33 |
| 12. | "Fever" | 3:32 |
| 13. | "Coastin'" | 2:30 |
| Total length: | | 42:40 |

== Personnel ==
- Tyler Bryant - vocals, guitar, bass (track 3), drums (track 3)
- Graham Whitford - guitar, background vocals
- Caleb Crosby - drums
- Ryan Fitzgerald - bass
- Rebecca Lovell - vocals (track 3), guitar (track 3)
- Charlie Starr - vocals (track 5)
- Roger Alan Nichols - track mixing
