= Tyler Bryant & the Shakedown =

American rock band

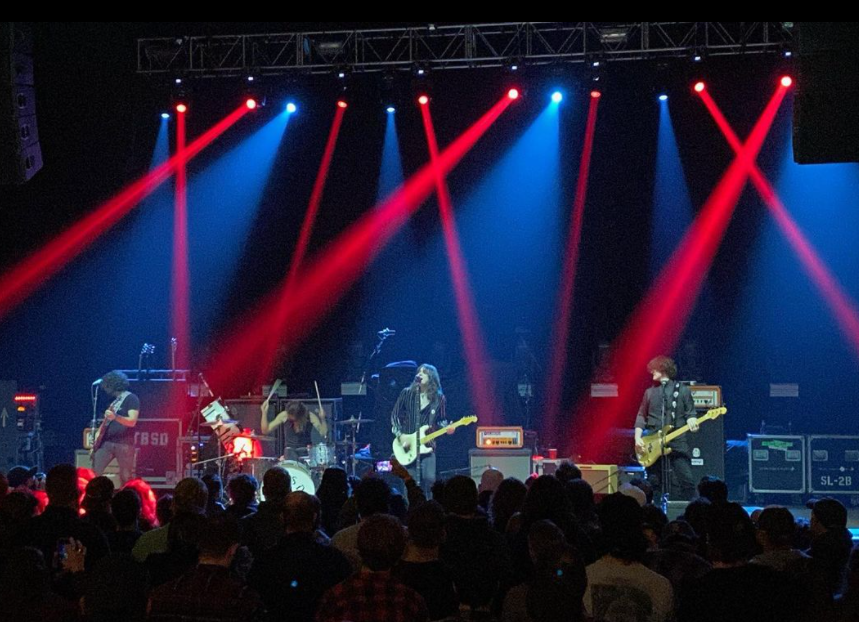
- Left to right: Graham Whitford, Tyler Bryant, Caleb Crosby, Ryan Fitzgerald.

Background information
- Origin: Nashville, Tennessee, U.S.
- Genres: Hard rock; blues rock; southern rock
- Years active: 2009–present
- Labels: Carved; Republic; Spinefarm; Rattle Shake
- Members: Tyler Bryant; Caleb Crosby; Graham Whitford; Diego Navaira
- Past members: Jason Stoltzfus; Calvin Webster; Noah Denney; Ryan Fitzgerald
- Website: tylerbryantandtheshakedown.com

Tyler Bryant & the Shakedown is an American rock band. Founded in Nashville, Tennessee by guitarist Tyler Bryant, the group has since released six successful studio albums, and has toured with such groups as Jeff Beck, ZZ Top, Aerosmith, AC/DC, Guns N' Roses and Lynyrd Skynyrd, as well as making appearances at several rock-themed music festivals. The group's current lineup consists of Tyler Bryant (lead guitar & vocals), Graham Whitford (rhythm guitar), Diego Navaira (bass), and Caleb Crosby (drums).

== History ==
=== Formation and early years (2008–2011) ===
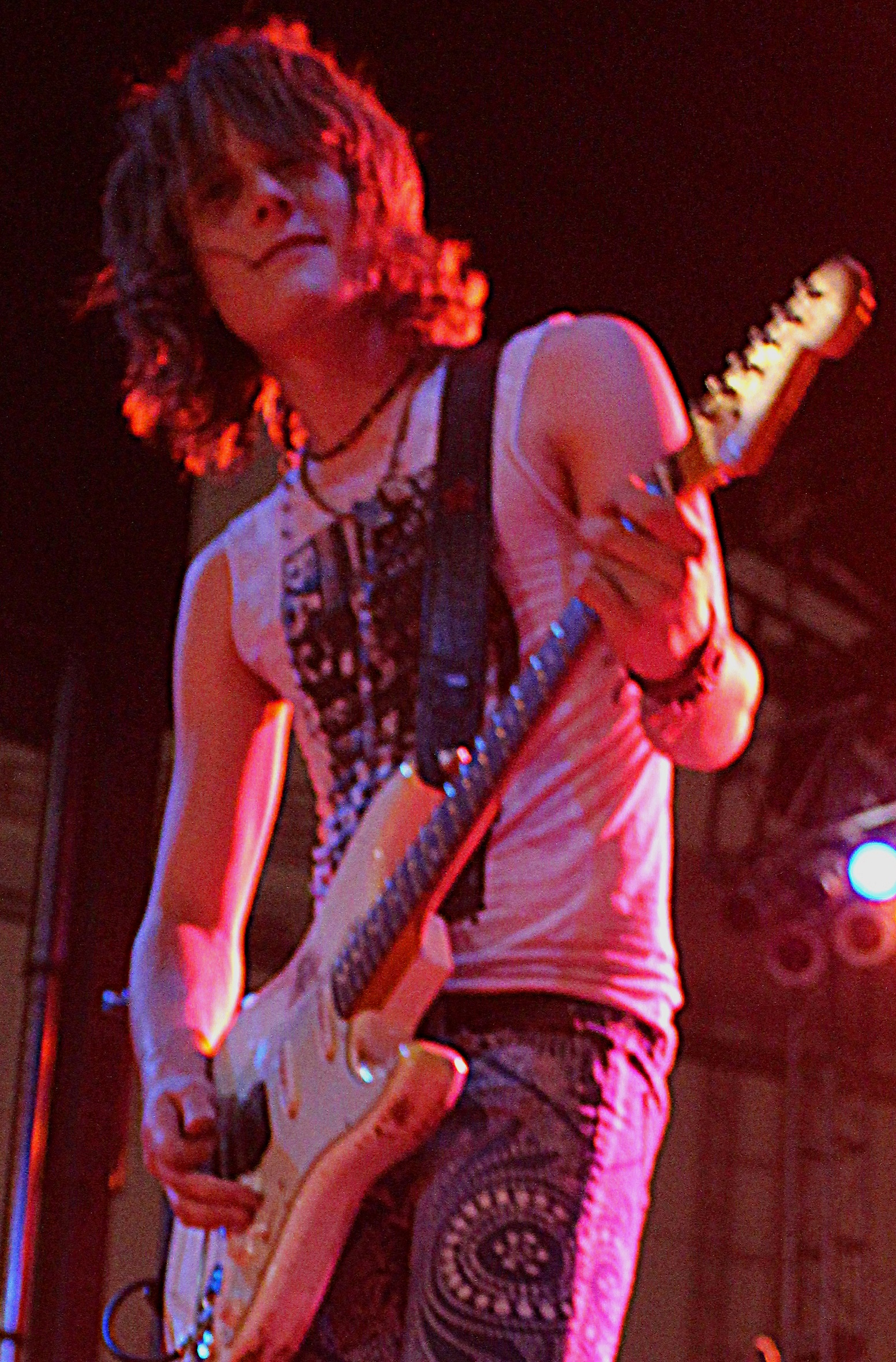
Tyler Bryant in 2016

Tyler Bryant put together his first band at the age of 15, which performed local shows in and around his hometown of Honey Grove, Texas. In 2008, Bryant moved to Nashville to pursue a career in songwriting. It was there that he first met Caleb Crosby and Calvin Webster, a bassist. The three formed Tyler Bryant & the Shakedown, and began performing in the clubs and bars of Nashville's music scene. The group did not initially have a manager, and Bryant would contact music venues pretending to be one in order to appear more professional. Jason Stoltzfus later joined the group on rhythm guitar, but lost interest within a few months of his involvement for reasons uncertain. In March 2011, Tyler Bryant & the Shakedown released their debut EP, titled My Radio. It was also around this time that Bryant did a radio interview in New York City, where he was introduced to Graham Whitford, son of Aerosmith's Brad Whitford, as the man who would "put him out of a job". Bryant invited him to Nashville to join the Shakedown on second guitar.

In September 2011, the group released their second EP, From the Sandcastle. The EP gained wider attention, and was featured in iTunes's "Rock on the Rise" section for eight weeks, with the song "Shackles" being featured as a discovery download. The song "Say a Prayer" was also featured in the trailer for the CBS show Vegas.

=== Carved, Republic, and mainstream success (2012–2016) ===
Calvin Webster left the group in May 2012 and was replaced by Noah Denney. This lineup made their first (and only so far) TV appearance on Jimmy Kimmel Live! on November 9, 2012. By this point, the group had signed to Carved Records, where they released their first full-length album, Wild Child. Recorded in a 13-day period on all-analog tape at Sputnik Sound Studios in Nashville by engineer Vance Powell, the album was officially released on January 22, 2013. The record was met with great praise, being featured in Rolling Stone and Interview. Blues Rock Review gave the album a perfect score of 10/10. One track on the album, "House on Fire", was featured on the episode of the FX series of Sons of Anarchy "The Mad King", which aired on October 8, 2013.

In 2014, Tyler Bryant & the Shakedown signed with Republic Records, which had initially offered to record a full album with the group. Once the album was completed, however, Republic would not release it. According to Bryant, this was because the label did not see any commercial potential in them. Nonetheless, six out of the thirteen songs recorded for the album were re-recorded and featured on the group's EP The Wayside, which was released by John Varvatos on November 13, 2015. One track off the EP, "Loaded Dice & Buried Money", received a positive review from Loudwire and spent three weeks on the Billboard Mainstream Rock charts, peaking at #37. To date, it is the only instance that Tyler Bryant & the Shakedown have appeared on the Billboard charts. The group then toured with AC/DC as the opening act for the last three legs of their Rock or Bust world tour, which included a string of performances in both the United States and Europe.

=== Spinefarm years (2017–2020) ===
After being kicked off of Republic, Tyler Bryant & the Shakedown began taking their career in a new direction. They signed to Snakefarm Records, a subsidiary of Finnish record label Spinefarm, where they released their self-titled album in November 2017. Recorded and produced by the band at Tyler’s home studio, The Bombay Palace, and mixed by John Fields, it was the first full album to be released by Tyler Bryant & the Shakedown since 2013's Wild Child. Classic Rock praised the album, claiming that "there's plenty of life left in rock 'n' roll yet". To promote the album, a music video for the track "Backfire" was produced and released on the group's YouTube channel on February 17, 2018. During this time, the group performed as an opening act for Guns & Roses during their long-running Not in This Lifetime... Tour.

The group's third full album, Truth and Lies, was released on June 28, 2019. The album was recorded in a two-week period between January and February 2019 at Studio G in Brooklyn and was produced by Joel Hamilton. Various music videos were produced to promote the album, with videos produced for the tracks "Shock & Awe", "Ride", and "Out There". In addition, a live music video for the tracks "Drive Me Mad", "Ride", and "Eye to Eye" was produced by Fender. Truth and Lies received a positive review from UDiscover Music, who claimed the album showed that "Rock is Alive and Well".

On March 26, 2020, it was announced that Noah Denney had left the group. Afterward, Tyler Bryant & the Shakedown began work on their fourth album, Pressure. Due to the COVID-19 pandemic, the album was recorded mostly at Bryant's home, though it featured guest musicians such as Bryant's wife Rebecca Lovell of Larkin Poe, as well as Blackberry Smoke member Charlie Starr. Ryan Fitzgerald, who had joined the group on bass following Denney's departure, did not participate in any promotional material for the album leading up to its release, with his addition to the group not being revealed until after the album's release on October 16, 2020.

=== Rattle Shake Records (2021–present) ===
Following the release of Pressure, Tyler Bryant & the Shakedown ended their association with Spinefarm. Their first independently-released single, "Born Rockin'", was released on September 17, 2021. This was followed up with the CD-exclusive release of the all-acoustic EP Rust 'N' Roll on September 23.

On August 12, 2022, the group announced the completion of their fifth studio album, Shake the Roots, to be released on September 9. The album is to be released under the group's new independent label, Rattle Shake Records. That same day, the group released their first single off the album, "Ain't None Watered Down", marking a shift towards a southern rock sound. The album was released in full on September 9. Six tracks which were recorded for the album but did not make the final cut would eventually be released on the EP Dirty Work, released on March 24, 2023.

On May 12, 2023, Tyler Bryant & the Shakedown performed a live set at Welcome to 1979 studios in Nashville. The performance was recorded and released as a vinyl-exclusive album on September 29, 2023.

By 2024, Ryan Fitzgerald had left the Shakedown, and Diego Navaira became the group's new bassist. The group's sixth album, Electrified, was released on May 10, 2024. The album notably contains collaborations with Larkin Poe and R&B singer Ruthie Foster.

== Discography ==
=== Studio albums ===
Title	Album details
Wild Child	Released: January 22, 2013; Label: Carved; Formats: CD, LP, digital
Tyler Bryant & the Shakedown	Released: November 3, 2017; Label: Snakefarm; Formats: CD, LP, digital
Truth and Lies	Released: June 28, 2019; Label: Snakefarm; Formats: CD, LP, digital
Pressure	Released: October 16, 2020; Label: Snakefarm; Formats: CD, LP, digital
Shake the Roots	Released: September 9, 2022; Label: Rattle Shake Records; Formats: CD, LP, digital
Electrified	Released: May 10, 2024; Label: Rattle Shake Records; Formats: CD, LP, digital

=== Live albums ===
Title	Album details
LIVE From '79	Released: September 29, 2023; Label: Rattle Shake Records; Formats: LP

=== Extended plays ===
Title	EP details
My Radio	Released: March 29, 2011; Label: Tyler Bryant Music; Formats: CD, digital
From the Sandcastle	Released: September 20, 2011; Label: Tyler Bryant Music; Formats: CD, digital
Bombay B-Sides	Released: April 2015; Label: Smokedown Records; Formats: CD
The Wayside	Released: November 13, 2015; Label: John Varvatos Records; Formats: CD, LP, digital
Rust ‘N’ Roll	Released: September 23, 2021; Label: Bare Bones Records; Formats: CD
Dirty Work	Released: March 24, 2023; Label: Bare Bones Records; Formats: CD, digital

== Band members ==
=== Current ===
- Tyler Bryant – guitar, lead vocals (2009–present)
- Caleb Crosby – drums (2009–present)
- Graham Whiftord – guitar, backing vocals (2010–present)
- Diego Navaira – bass, backing vocals (2024–present)

=== Past ===
- Jason Stoltzfus – guitar (2010-2010)
- Calvin Webster – bass (2009-2012)
- Noah Denney – bass (2012-2020)
- Ryan Fitzgerald – bass (2020-2024)
