= Blood Harmony (album) =

Studio album by Larkin Poe
- Released: November 11, 2022
- Length: 42:22
- Label: Tricki-Woo
- Producer: Larkin Poe; Tyler Bryant

Larkin Poe chronology
Kindred Spirits (2020)	Blood Harmony (2022)	Bloom (2025)

Professional ratings
Review scores
Source	Rating
American Songwriter	4/5 stars
The Arts Desk	4/5 stars

Blood Harmony is the sixth studio album by American roots rock band Larkin Poe, released on 11 November 2022, by Tricki-Woo Records.

Blood Harmony won the 2024 Grammy Award for Best Contemporary Blues Album.

== Track listing ==
No.	Title	Writer(s)	Length
1.	"Deep Stays Down"	Rebecca Lovell; Tyler Bryant	3:19
2.	"Bad Spell"	Megan Lovell; R. Lovell; Bryant	3:15
3.	"Georgia Off My Mind"	R. Lovell; Bryant	3:54
4.	"Strike Gold"	R. Lovell; M. Lovell	3:20
5.	"Southern Comfort"	R. Lovell	3:47
6.	"Bolt Cutters & the Family Name"	R. Lovell; Tarka Layman	3:15
7.	"Blood Harmony"	R. Lovell; Bryant; Kevin McGowan	4:05
8.	"Kick the Blues"	R. Lovell; M. Lovell	3:26
9.	"Might as Well Be Me"	Luther Russell; R. Lovell; M. Lovell	5:10
10.	"Summertime Sunset"	R. Lovell; M. Lovell	5:09
11.	"Lips as Cold as Diamond"	R. Lovell	3:42
Total length:			42:22

== Personnel ==
Larkin Poe

- Rebecca Lovell – lead vocals, electric guitar; keyboards
- Megan Lovell – harmony vocals, lap steel; Dobro
- Tarka Layman – electric bass

Additional musicians

- Tyler Bryant – programming, keyboards; electric bass
- Mike Seal – Hammond and Wurlitzer organs
- Caleb Crosby – drums; percussion
- Kevin McGowan – drums; percussion
- Trissa Lovell – harmony vocals

Production and artwork

- Larkin Poe – producer
- Tyler Bryant – producer; engineer
- Roger Alan Nichols – engineer
- David Benyamin – mixing
- Dan Shike – mastering
- Devin Wilson – artwork

== Charts ==
Chart	Peak position
Austrian Albums (Ö3 Austria)	41
French Albums (SNEP)	117
German Albums (Offizielle Top 100)	31
Scottish Albums (Official Charts)	10
Swiss Albums (Schweizer Hitparade)	24
UK Albums (Official Charts)	59
UK Album Downloads (Official Charts)	10
UK Americana Albums (Official Charts)	3
UK Independent Albums (Official Charts)	5
US Top Album Sales (Billboard)	44
