= Truth and Lies (Tyler Bryant & the Shakedown album) =

Studio album by Tyler Bryant & the Shakedown
- Released: June 28, 2019
- Recorded: January 20–February 4, 2019; July 2018
- Studio: Studio G, Brooklyn
- Genre: Hard rock
- Length: 44:41
- Label: Snakefarm
- Producer: Tyler Bryant & the Shakedown; Joel Hamilton

Tyler Bryant & the Shakedown chronology
Tyler Bryant & the Shakedown (2017)	Truth and Lies (2019)	Pressure (2020)

Singles from Truth and Lies
- 1. "On To The Next" Released: March 29, 2019; 2. "Shock & Awe" Released: May 24, 2019

Truth and Lies is the third full studio album by the American rock group Tyler Bryant & the Shakedown. It was released on June 28, 2019.

== Background and recording ==
In 2018, Tyler Bryant & the Shakedown began work on their second studio album for Snakefarm Records, initially writing a total of 55 songs to consider recording for the album. The list was eventually narrowed down to 27 songs, which were rehearsed and demoed by the group at Bryant's home studio, the Bombay Palace. In January 2019, the group headed to Studio G in Brooklyn, ultimately recording 13 of the 27 tracks rehearsed, which were mixed by the group with the help of sound engineer and producer Joel Hamilton. Also recorded for the album was "Out There", which Bryant had originally written in 2013, and had already recorded the vocal and resonator tracks for at his home studio in July 2018. The album was completed within two and a half weeks of recording.

== Release and reception ==
The first single off the album, "On To The Next", was released on March 29, 2019. The track "Shock & Awe" was released as a single on May 24, its release being accompanied by a music video for the song which featured boa constrictors and Bryant playing in a bird skull mask. Truth and Lies was released in full on June 28, 2019. UDiscover Music gave the album a positive review, stating that it prove "Rock is Alive and Well". Blues Rock Review also praised the album, giving it a score of 8.5 out of 10. The Rockpit praised the album for its variety in sound, and stated that Truth and Lies was the group's "best album to date". Classic Rock listed the album at #36 on their 50 Best Albums of 2019 list.

Truth and Lies also saw success in France, making Ouï FM's Top 40 songs.

== Track listing ==
No.	Title	Length
1.	"Shock & Awe"	3:12
2.	"On To The Next"	2:59
3.	"Ride"	3:26
4.	"Shape I'm In"	3:21
5.	"Eye to Eye"	3:30
6.	"Panic Button"	3:00
7.	"Judgement Day"	3:11
8.	"Drive Me Mad"	2:44
9.	"Without You"	3:31
10.	"Trouble"	2:51
11.	"Out There"	4:52
12.	"Cry Wolf"	3:27
13.	"Couldn't See the Fire"	4:42
Total length:		44:41

== Personnel ==
- Tyler Bryant - lead vocals, guitar
- Graham Whitford - guitar, background vocals
- Noah Denney - bass guitar, background vocals
- Caleb Crosby - drums
- Joel Hamilton - mixing, percussion, mellotron
