= Self Made Man (album) =

Studio album by Larkin Poe
- Released: June 12, 2020
- Studio: Bell Tone (Nashville)
- Length: 34:58
- Label: Tricki-Woo
- Producers: Rebecca Lovell; Megan Lovell

Larkin Poe chronology
Venom & Faith (2018)	Self Made Man (2020)	Kindred Spirits (2020)

Professional ratings
Aggregate scores
Source	Rating
Metacritic	78/100
Review scores
Source	Rating
American Songwriter	4.5/5 stars
Exclaim!	7/10

Self Made Man is the fourth studio album by American roots rock band Larkin Poe, released on June 12, 2020, by Tricki-Woo Records.

== Critical reception ==
Self Made Man was met with "generally favorable" reviews from critics. At Metacritic, which assigns a weighted average rating out of 100 to reviews from mainstream publications, this release received an average score of 78, based on 7 reviews. Aggregator Album of Year gave the album 77 out of 100 based on a critical consensus of 8 reviews.

== Track listing ==
Self Made Man track listing
No.	Title	Writer(s)	Length
1.	"She's a Self Made Man"	Megan Lovell; Rebecca Lovell	3:02
2.	"Holy Ghost Fire"	R. Lovell	3:23
3.	"Keep Diggin'"	M. Lovell; R. Lovell; Tony Esterly	3:13
4.	"Back Down South" (featuring Tyler Bryant)	R. Lovell; Tyler Bryant	3:55
5.	"Tears of Blue to Gold"	M. Lovell; R. Lovell	3:12
6.	"God Moves on the Water"	Blind Willie Johnson	2:44
7.	"Every Bird That Flies"	M. Lovell; R. Lovell; Pat McLaughlin	3:41
8.	"Scorpion"	R. Lovell	3:13
9.	"Danger Angel"	R. Lovell	2:28
10.	"Ex-Con"	R. Lovell	3:57
11.	"Easy Street"	M. Lovell; R. Lovell; Esterly	2:17
Total length:			34:58

== Personnel ==
=== Larkin Poe ===
- Rebecca Lovell – lead vocals, resonator guitar, acoustic guitar, programming, B3 organ, clavinet, background vocals, electric guitar (tracks 1–3, 5–11)
- Megan Lovell – lap steel, baritone lap steel, analog synthesizer, background vocals

=== Additional musicians ===
- Kevin McGowan – percussion (tracks 1–5, 7–11)
- Tarka Layman – electric bass (tracks 5, 8, 10)
- Tyler Bryant – electric guitar (track 4)

=== Technical personnel ===
- Rebecca Lovell – production
- Megan Lovell – production
- Roger Alan Nichols – engineering
- Ryan Hewitt – mixing
- Dan Shike – mastering
- Robby Klein – photography
- Bree Marie Fish – photography
- Jason Lee Denton – layout, design

== Charts ==
Chart performance for Self Made Man
Chart (2020)	Peak position
German Albums (Offizielle Top 100)	79
Scottish Albums (Official Charts)	9
Swiss Albums (Schweizer Hitparade)	41
UK Albums (Official Charts)	76
UK Americana Albums (Official Charts)	1
UK Independent Albums (Official Charts)	1
US Americana/Folk Albums (Billboard)	8
US Top Blues Albums (Billboard)	1
US Independent Albums (Billboard)	39
