= Perfectamundo =

Studio album by Billy Gibbons and The BFG's
- Released: November 6, 2015
- Recorded: 2015
- Genres: Blues rock, Afro-Cuban
- Length: 39:13
- Label: Concord
- Producers: Billy Gibbons, Joe Hardy

Billy Gibbons and The BFG's chronology
Perfectamundo (2015)	The Big Bad Blues (2018)

Singles from Perfectamundo
- 1. "Treat Her Right" Released: September 14, 2015; 2. "Quiero Mas Dinero" Released: October 26, 2016

Perfectamundo is the debut studio album by American rock musician Billy Gibbons and rock band The BFG's. The album was released on November 6, 2015, by Concord Records.

== Critical reception ==
Professional ratings
Aggregate scores
Source	Rating
Metacritic	67/100
Review scores
Source	Rating
AllMusic	3.5/5 stars
American Songwriter	4/5 stars
Chicago Tribune	2/4 stars
The Guardian	3/5 stars
PopMatters	3/10 stars
Rolling Stone	3/5 stars

Perfectamundo received generally positive reviews from music critics. At Metacritic, which assigns a normalized rating out of 100 to reviews from mainstream critics, the album received an average score of 67 based on 11 reviews, which indicates "generally positive reviews".

== Track listing ==
No.	Title	Writer(s)	Length
1.	"Got Love If You Want It"	James Moore	4:17
2.	"Treat Her Right"	Roy Head, Gene Kurtz	2:23
3.	"You're What's Happenin', Baby"	Billy Gibbons, Michael E. Barfield, Mike Flanigin, Alx "Guitarzza" Garza, Ludovic Navarre, Jack Nitzsche	6:07
4.	"Sal y Pimiento"	Gibbons	3:13
5.	"Pickin' Up Chicks On Dowling Street"	Gibbons, Joe Hardy, G.L. Moon	4:11
6.	"Hombre Sin Nombre"	Gibbons, Hardy, Moon	3:49
7.	"Quiero Mas Dinero"	Gibbons, Garza, Hardy, Moon	3:26
8.	"Baby Please Don't Go"	Joseph Lee Williams	2:31
9.	"Piedras Negras"	Gibbons, Hardy, Moon	3:09
10.	"Perfectamundo"	Gibbons, Garza, Hardy	2:44
11.	"Q-Vo"	Gibbons, Jimmy McGriff	3:23
Total length:			39:13

== Personnel ==
- Billy Gibbons: Vocals, Guitar, Bass guitar, Hammond B3, Piano, composer, Design, producer
- Mike Flanigin: Hammond B3, Composer
- Alx "Guitarzza" Garza: Bass guitar
- Martin Guigui: Hammond B3, Piano, Producer
- Joe Hardy: Guitar, Bass guitar, Keyboards, Vocals, Mastering, Mixing, producer
- G.L. Moon: Guitar, Composer, Engineer
- Greg Morrow: Drums, engineer
- Nick Jay: Audio Engineer on "Q-Vo"
