= Hardware (Billy Gibbons album) =

Studio album by Billy Gibbons
- Released: June 4, 2021
- Recorded: 2020
- Genre: Rock
- Length: 36:56
- Label: Concord Records
- Producers: Billy Gibbons; Matt Sorum; Mike Fiorentino; Chad Shlosser

Billy Gibbons chronology
The Big Bad Blues (2018)	Hardware (2021)

Hardware is the third solo studio album by American rock musician Billy Gibbons. The album was released on June 4, 2021, by Concord Records.

== Production and recording ==
Gibbons described the recording process in several interviews.

It was Matt Sorum that rang up out of the clear blue, way back in June, and he said, “I don't know about you, but I'm ready to do something. And making loud noise is right up our alley, so how would you feel about going out and checking out a new recording studio?” And I said, “Gee whiz! That's music to my ears! Whaddaya got in mind?” And he said, “Oh, there's a place out near Joshua Tree.” And I initially suspected that he was referring to Rancho De La Luna, where I had worked with Josh Homme and his Queens of the Stone Age project. But Matt said, “No, it's right across the highway.” Little did he tell me that it was not only across the highway, but it was 20 miles back into the desert. But sure enough, we teamed up, we went from Palm Springs down the road there, and when we arrived, I thought, “Oh, 30 minutes, we'll have a look around.” Well, those 30 minutes turned into three months. We walked through the front door, and we didn't leave until we had wrapped up this album project. And even better was that the studio had already placed a scattering of instruments laying about, because when we arrived, Matt didn't even have a drum stick, and I didn't have a guitar pick. But—lo and behold—in the studio, to my delight, they had an old Fender Jazzmaster guitar, leaning up against a Fender reverb tank. And Matt tuned up a set of skins that was in a corner, and off we went. And the first crack outta the box was the single that was released in the last couple of weeks, “West Coast Junkie.”

Gibbons said “We found an old Fender Jazz – '64 or '65 – in the studio and everyone had a go...The unusual one was watching Matt step out from behind the drums and slamming down on a bass guitar. It was quite a surprise."
“The desert settings, replete with shifting sands, cacti and rattlesnakes makes for the kind of backdrop that lends an element of intrigue reflected in the sounds created out there." The day they got there they were greeted by a pair of rattlesnakes on the porch. In the afternoon they'd sit and watch the eagles fly overhead. “You read about these places, you see travelogue photos, but when you're there the energy is imbibed,” says Gibbons. “It's something you feel.”

== Critical reception ==
Professional ratings
Aggregate scores
Source	Rating
Metacritic	80/100
Review scores
Source	Rating
AllMusic	4/5 stars
American Songwriter	3.5/5 stars
The Arts Desk	3/5 stars
Classic Rock	4/5 stars
Mojo	4/5 stars
Record Collector	3/5 stars
The Sydney Morning Herald	3/5 stars
Uncut	3.5/5 stars

Hardware received generally positive reviews from critics. At Metacritic, which assigns a normalized rating out of 100 to reviews from critics, the album received an average score of 80, which indicates "generally favorable reviews", based on 6 reviews.

== Track listing ==
All songs written by Billy Gibbons, Matt Sorum, Mike Fiorentino and Chad Shlosser except where noted.

Hardware track listing
No.	Title	Writer(s)	Length
1.	"My Lucky Card"		2:33
2.	"She's On Fire"		2:46
3.	"More-More-More"		3:02
4.	"Shuffle, Step & Slide"		3:10
5.	"Vagabond Man"	Gibbons; Sorum; Fiorentino	3:59
6.	"Spanish Fly"		4:01
7.	"West Coast Junkie"		2:48
8.	"Stackin' Bones" (featuring Larkin Poe)		3:16
9.	"I Was a Highway"	Gibbons; Josh Dunne; Fiorentino; Neil Mason; Tim Montana; Sorum; Shlosser	2:34
10.	"S-G-L-M-B-B-R"	Gibbons; Fiorentino	2:25
11.	"Hey Baby, Que Paso"	Augie Meyers; Bill Sheffield	2:53
12.	"Desert High"		3:27
Total length:			36:56

== Personnel ==
- Billy Gibbons - vocals, guitars, bass guitar, 'virtual' bass (Note: Bass parts played on guitar using 'A Little Thunder' pickup, which only registers low-frequency sounds.)
- Matt Sorum – drums, bass guitar
- Chad Shlosser – electric guitar, bass guitar, synthesizers
- Mike Fiorentino - accordion, synths, vocals
- Larkin Poe - vocals on "Stackin' Bones"

== Charts ==
=== Weekly charts ===
Chart performance for Hardware
Chart (2021)	Peak position
Austrian Albums (Ö3 Austria)	8
Belgian Albums (Ultratop Flanders)	14
Belgian Albums (Ultratop Wallonia)	9
Dutch Albums (Album Top 100)	80
Finnish Albums (Suomen virallinen lista)	9
French Albums (SNEP)	66
German Albums (Offizielle Top 100)	4
Scottish Albums (Official Charts)	5
Swiss Albums (Schweizer Hitparade)	1
UK Albums (Official Charts)	18
UK Rock & Metal Albums (Official Charts)	1
US Billboard 200	111
US Independent Albums (Billboard)	17
US Top Rock Albums (Billboard)	17
US Indie Store Album Sales (Billboard)	3

=== Year-end charts ===
Year-end chart performance for Hardware
Chart (2021)	Position
Swiss Albums (Schweizer Hitparade)	88
