= The Big Bad Blues =

Studio album by Billy Gibbons
- Released: September 21, 2018
- Recorded: 2018
- Genre: Blues rock
- Length: 39:48
- Label: Concord
- Producers: Billy Gibbons, Joe Hardy

Billy Gibbons chronology
Perfectamundo (2015)	The Big Bad Blues (2018)	Hardware (2021)

Singles from The Big Bad Blues
- 1. "Rollin' And Tumblin'" Released: July 20, 2018; 2. "Missin' Yo' Kissin'" Released: August 9, 2018; 3. "Standing Around Crying" Released: September 4, 2018

The Big Bad Blues is the second studio album by American rock musician Billy Gibbons. The album was released on September 21, 2018, by Concord Records. At the 40th Blues Music Awards, the album was named as 'Blues Rock Album of the Year'.

== Critical reception ==
Professional ratings
Aggregate scores
Source	Rating
Metacritic	74/100
Review scores
Source	Rating
AllMusic	4/5 stars
American Songwriter	3.5/5 stars

The Big Bad Blues received generally positive reviews from critics. At Metacritic, which assigns a normalized rating out of 100 to reviews from mainstream publications, the album received an average score of 74, based on four reviews.

== Track listing ==
All tracks are written by Billy Gibbons, except where noted.

No.	Title	Writer(s)	Length
1.	"Missin' Yo' Kissin'"	Gilly Stillwater	3:19
2.	"My Baby She Rocks"		3:49
3.	"Second Line"		3:40
4.	"Standing Around Crying"	McKinley Morganfield	4:24
5.	"Let the Left Hand Know"		3:53
6.	"Bring It to Jerome"	Jerome Green	4:34
7.	"That's What She Said"		3:13
8.	"Mo' Slower Blues"		3:57
9.	"Hollywood 151"		3:21
10.	"Rollin' and Tumblin'"	Morganfield	2:56
11.	"Crackin' Up"	Ellas McDaniel	2:42
Total length:			39:48

== Personnel ==
- Billy Gibbons: Guitar, Harmonica, Vocals
- James Harman: Harmonica
- Joe Hardy: Fender Bass Guitar
- Elwood Francis: Guitar & Harmonica
- Greg Morrow: Drums
- Matt Sorum: Drums
- Mike Flanigin: Keyboards

== Charts ==
Chart (2018)	Peak position
Austrian Albums (Ö3 Austria)	19
Belgian Albums (Ultratop Flanders)	43
Belgian Albums (Ultratop Wallonia)	19
Czech Albums (ČNS IFPI)	63
Dutch Albums (Album Top 100)	109
German Albums (Offizielle Top 100)	8
Swiss Albums (Schweizer Hitparade)	4
UK Albums (Official Charts)	19
US Billboard 200	73
