= Flash (Moving Sidewalks album) =

Studio album by Moving Sidewalks
- Released: 1969, 2000 (re-issue)
- Recorded: 1968
- Studio: Gold Star Recording Studios, Houston, Texas
- Genre: Psychedelic rock; blues rock; garage rock
- Length: Original-41:10; Reissue-54:36
- Label: Tantara
- Producer: Steve Ames

Moving Sidewalks chronology
Flash (1969)	99th Floor (1982)

Professional ratings
Review scores
Source	Rating
Allmusic	3.5/5 stars

Flash (1969) is an album by Moving Sidewalks, Billy Gibbons's band prior to forming ZZ Top a year after its release. The Sidewalks' music was more in line with the psychedelic rock movement rather than the blues rock sound ZZ Top would be famous for. It was re-released in 2000 with bonus tracks and again in 2022 on both vinyl and CD. It was recorded in the band's hometown of Houston at Gold Star Recording Studio, later renamed Sugar Hill Recording Studios.

== Track listing ==
=== Original 1969 Issue ===
- All Songs Published By Tantara Music, except where noted.
1. "Flashback" (Steve Ames) 4:44
2. "Scoun Da Be" (Tom Moore) 2:08
3. "You Make Me Shake" (Billy Gibbons) 3:03
4. "You Don't Know the Life" (Moore) 3:54
5. "Pluto - Sept. 31st" (Gibbons, Ames) 5:14
6. "No Good to Cry" (Al Anderson; Onesider Ltd.-Barrisue) 4:33
7. "Crimson Witch" (Gibbons) 3:07
8. "Joe Blues" (Gibbons, Moore, Dan Mitchell, Don Summers) 7:36
9. "Eclipse" (Gibbons, Ames) 3:51
10. "Reclipse" (Gibbons, Ames) 2:32

=== Bonus Tracks (added to Akarma Records' 2000 re-issue) ===
1. "99th Floor" (Gibbons) 2:17
2. "What Are You Going To Do" (Gibbons) 2:29
3. "I Want To Hold Your Hand" (Lennon–McCartney) 3:20
4. "Need Me" (Gibbons) 2:14
5. "Every Night A New Surprise" (Ames) 2:58

== Personnel ==
- Bill "Billy" Gibbons: Guitars, Harmonica, Vocal
- Tom Moore: Organ, Piano
- Don Summers: Bass
- Dan Mitchell: Drums, Percussion
- Isaac Costa: Keyboards, Violin, Flute

== Production ==
- Produced By Steve Ames
- Recording Engineers: Bert Frilot, Doyle Jones
- Mix & Re-Mix: Neal Ceppos
