= Lovell Sisters =

American acoustic trio (2003–2010)

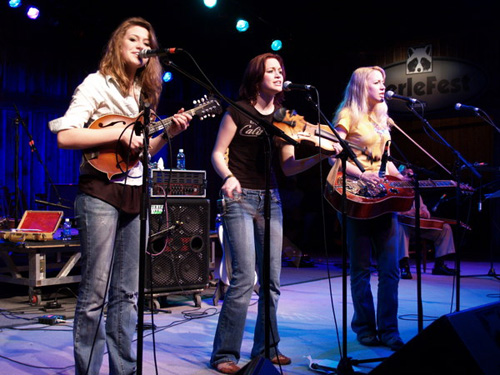
- Rebecca, Jessica, and Megan Lovell, Watson Stage, Merlefest 2007

Background information
- Origin: Signal Mountain, Tennessee, US
- Genres: Folk rock, bluegrass, Americana
- Years active: 2003-2010
- Label: 2DefPig

The Lovell Sisters were an American acoustic music trio, known for their tight harmonies and strong instrumental performances. The Lovell Sisters consisted of three permanent members: Jessica, Megan and Rebecca Lovell. Although the band had roots in bluegrass and classical music, the band described its music as progressive acoustic. Megan & Rebecca founded Larkin Poe after Jessica left the group.

== History ==
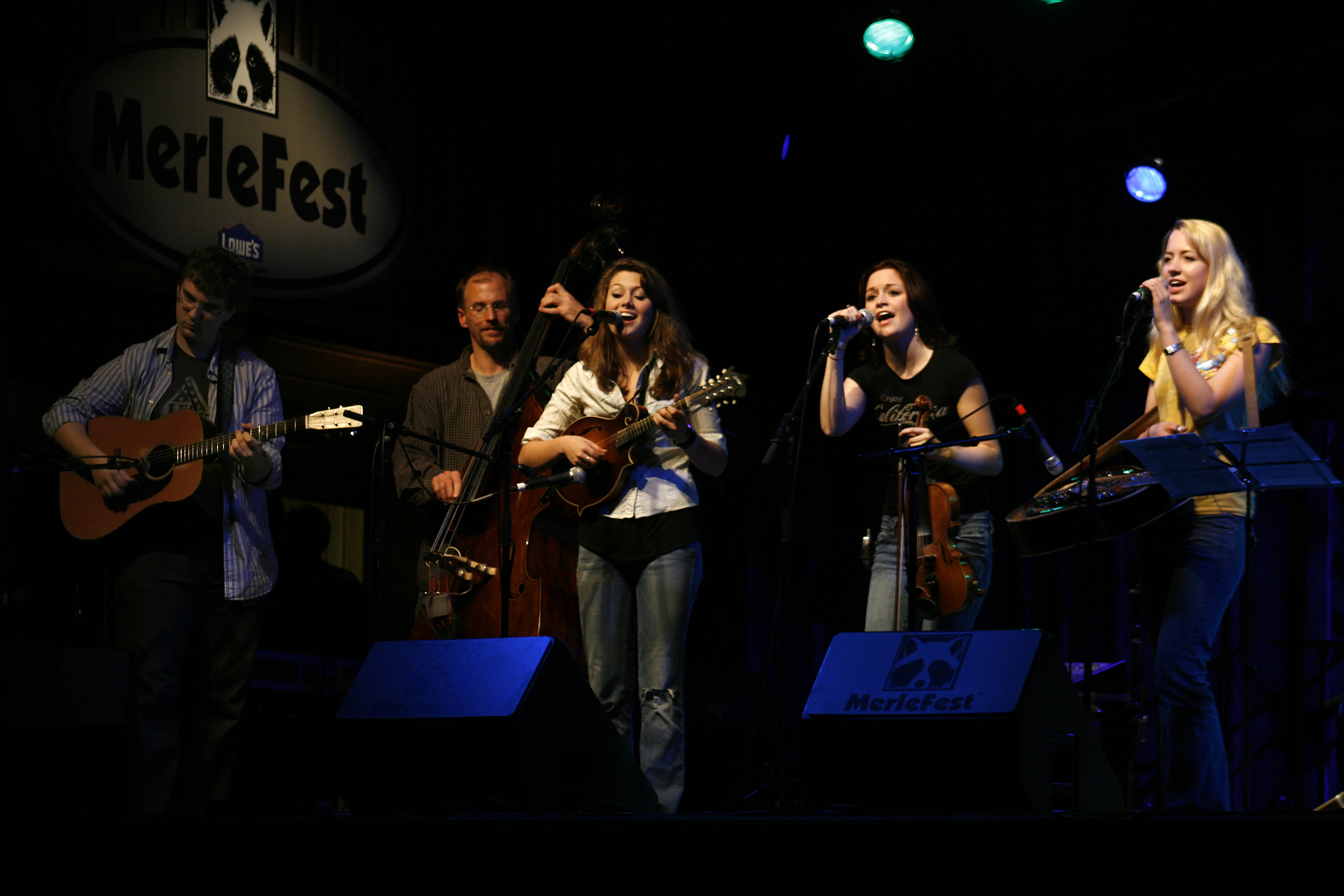
Lovell Sisters Band on Watson Stage, MerleFest 2007

As children, Jessica, Megan, and Rebecca took classical violin and piano lessons and were members of their local youth symphony. They began singing in public with their church choir and credit their classical training with developing their technical ability and teaching them how to practice. The family heard its first bluegrass recording, Slide Rule by Jerry Douglas, and were inspired to check out their local traditional-music scene.

In 2004, the Lovell Sisters Band (LSB) debuted at the Mountain Opry in Signal Mountain, Tennessee. The next year, The Lovell Sisters appeared on "A Prairie Home Companion" and won the Prairie Home National Teen Talent Competition. The group's first album, When Forever Rolls Around, was released that September. In 2006, Rebecca won the MerleFest mandolin contest. At 15 years of age, she was the youngest person (and only woman) to win a MerleFest instrument competition.

The Lovell Sisters' song "Distance" won the 2008 John Lennon Songwriting Contest grand prize in the country genre. "Time to Grow" received an honorable mention in the 2008 International Songwriting Competition.

On December 16, 2009, The Lovell Sisters announced that Jessica's wedding engagement and plans to begin college the following year marked the group's disbandment. Their final concert was at the Harris Arts Center in their hometown of Calhoun, Georgia on January 16, 2010.

== Band members ==
- Jessica Lovell: lead vocals, fiddle.
- Megan Lovell: harmony vocals, dobro and lap steel.
- Rebecca Lovell: lead and harmony vocals, mandolin and guitar.
- Jake Stargel: guitar
- Matt Wingate: acoustic guitar
- Daniel Kimbro: upright bass
- Chad Melton: percussion
- Mike Seal: guitar

== Discography ==
- Lovell Sisters Band (2005). When Forever Rolls Around. 2DefPigs Records.
- Lovell Sisters (2008). Live at the Philadelphia Folk Festival (DVD).
- Lovell Sisters (2009). Time to Grow. 2DefPigs Records.

== See also ==
- Larkin Poe – American roots rock duo, successor to the Lovell Sisters
