= The Moving Sidewalks =

American rock band

- Genres: Psychedelic rock; blues rock; garage rock
- Years active: 1966–1969; 2013
- Spinoffs: ZZ Top
- Past members: Billy Gibbons; Tom Moore; Don Summers; Dan Mitchell; Isaac Costa

The Moving Sidewalks were an American rock band formed in 1966 from Houston, Texas. They released several singles and an album, before bassist Don Summers and keyboardist Tom Moore were drafted into the army, bringing the band to an end. Vocalist/guitarist Billy Gibbons and drummer Dan Mitchell then formed ZZ Top.

== History ==
While attending Warner Brothers' art school in Hollywood, California, Billy Gibbons engaged with his first bands, including the Saints, Billy G & the Blueflames, and the Coachmen. By 1967, Gibbons had returned to Houston and formed the Moving Sidewalks, conceptually inspired by friend and fellow musician Roky Erickson and the 13th Floor Elevators. Shortly thereafter they recorded "99th Floor". The single was well received, and topped the charts at No. 1 in Houston for six weeks. The success of this record led them to sign with Wand Records, which then released "Need Me", also a Top 10 hit for the band. The group was asked to open for many touring rock acts, including the Doors and Jimi Hendrix, who became a friend of Gibbons.

In total, the Moving Sidewalks recorded several singles and one full-length album, Flash. After Tom Moore and Don Summers were drafted into the United States Army, Gibbons and Mitchell added Lanier Greig and formed the original ZZ Top.

In January 2013, Gibbons announced the Moving Sidewalks would reunite with all original members for a single performance, on March 30, 2013, at B. B. King's Blues Club in New York City. The concert tickets sold out, and due to strong fan support the band played two more gigs: as official headliners of Austin Psych Fest on May 1, 2013, and at the Charity Gala for the Deacons of Deadwood Ball on September 28, 2013, in Houston.

== Discography ==
=== Albums ===
- Flash (1969) Tantara TS 6919. The original release. Produced by manager Steve Ames.
- 99th Floor (1982) Eva 12002. Reissue of the Tantara album plus the five tracks that were issued on singles only.
- Flash (2000) Akarma AK 117. Another reissue of the Tantara album with the five singles tracks.
- The Pre-ZZ Houston Roots (2004) Lone Star LSR 19629. A compilation of material by the Moving Sidewalks, including six unreleased tracks; 21 songs total.
- The Roots of ZZ Top (2010) Fuel 61820. A compilation of seven Moving Sidewalks songs, four Warlocks songs, seven American Blues songs; all tracks previously released on various singles and albums.
- The Complete Collection (2012) Rockbeat ROC 3018. A compilation of material by the Moving Sidewalks, including six unreleased tracks; also includes demo material by Billy Gibbons' first band, the Coachmen; 26 songs total.

=== EPs ===
- The Moving Sidewalks - A Band from Texas (1982) Another Mangy Mutt 1030. This 7-inch EP was released on the indie label MUTT, a subsidiary of the Moxie Record Company. It is a mono recording and the playback speed is at 45 rpm for Side A and 33 rpm for Side B. This record is a combination/compilation of the band's A and B sides from their first two singles for Wand Records.
  - Side A: "99th Floor"; "What Are You Going to Do"
  - Side B: "Every Night a New Surprise"; "Need Me"

=== Singles ===
- "99th Floor" / "What Are You Going to Do" (1967) Tantara 3101; reissued as Wand 1156
- "Need Me" / "Every Night a New Surprise" (1967) Wand 1167
- "I Want to Hold Your Hand" / "Joe Blues" (1968) Tantara 3108
- "Flashback" (4:15 – radio edit) / "No Good to Cry" (3:08 – radio edit) (1969) Tantara 3113
