= Billy Gibbons =

American rock guitarist (born 1949)

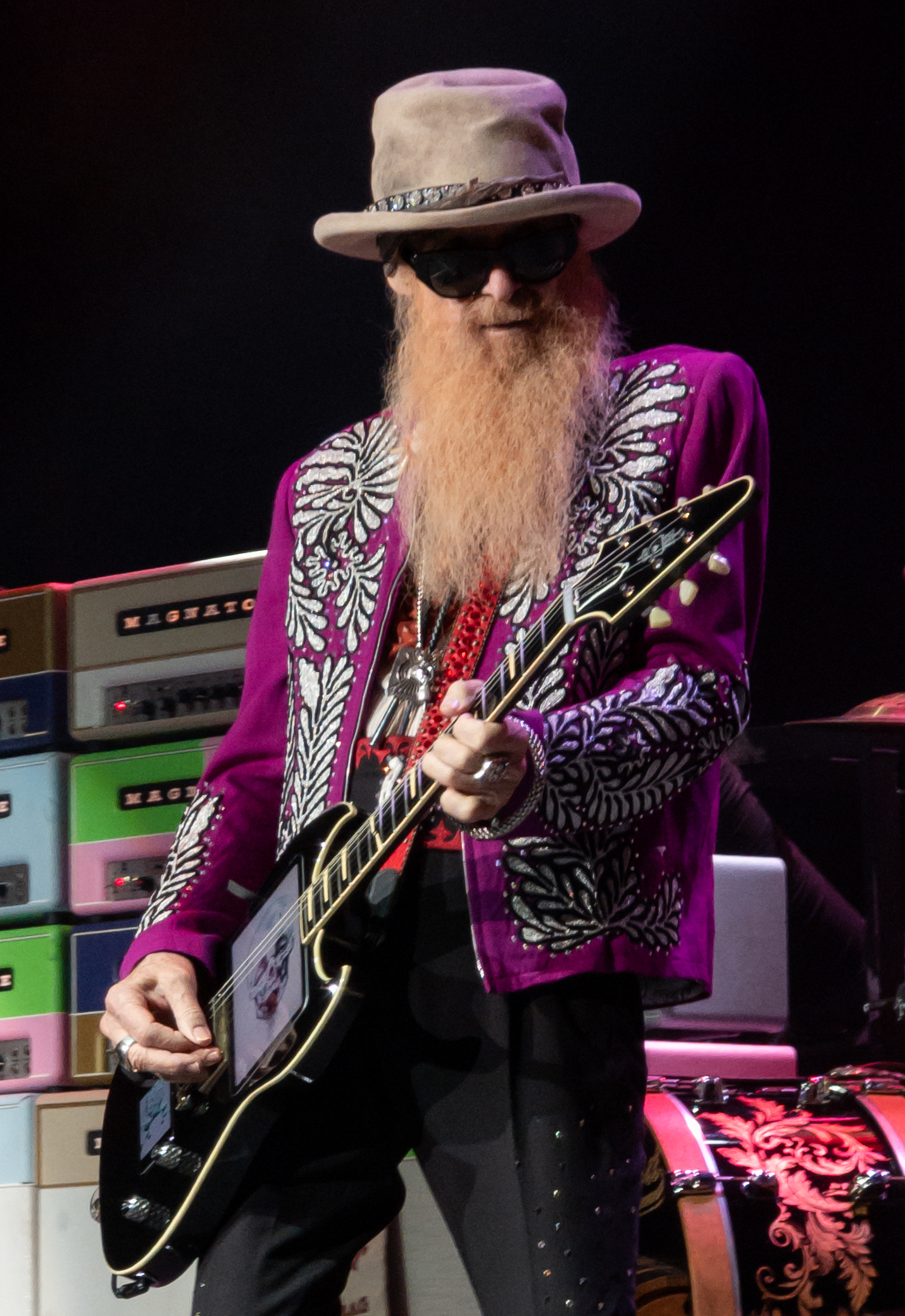
- Gibbons performing in 2025

Background information
- Also known as: Billy F. Gibbons; Reverend
- Born: William Frederick Gibbons; December 16, 1949 (age 76); Houston, Texas, U.S.
- Genres: Blues rock; hard rock; boogie rock; Southern rock
- Occupations: Musician; singer; songwriter; record producer
- Instruments: Guitar; vocals
- Years active: 1967–present
- Member of: ZZ Top
- Formerly of: Moving Sidewalks
- Website: billygibbons.com

William Frederick Gibbons (born December 16, 1949) is an American rock musician who is the founder, guitarist, primary songwriter, lead vocalist and only constant member of ZZ Top. Following the deaths of bassist Dusty Hill (2021) and drummer Frank Beard (2026), Gibbons is the only living member of the 1970s-2020s ZZ Top lineup.

He began his career in Moving Sidewalks, who recorded Flash (1969) and opened four dates for the Jimi Hendrix Experience. Gibbons formed ZZ Top in late 1969 and released ZZ Top's First Album in early 1971. He has also maintained a solo career in recent years, starting with his first album Perfectamundo (2015).

Gibbons has made appearances with other artists and acted on television shows, most notably in a recurring role as Angela's rock star father on Bones. In 2001, Rolling Stone named him the 32nd greatest guitarist of all time.

== Early life ==
Gibbons was born to Frederick Royal ("Freddie") and Lorraine (née Duffy) Gibbons in the Tanglewood neighborhood of Houston, Texas. His father was an entertainer, orchestra conductor, and concert pianist who worked alongside his second cousin, art director Cedric Gibbons, for Samuel Goldwyn at MGM Studios. When Gibbons was five years old, his mother took him and his sister to see Elvis Presley. At age seven, Gibbons's father took him to a B. B. King recording session. A percussionist at first, Gibbons was sent by his father to New York City to study with Tito Puente. In 1962, Gibbons received his first electric guitar following his 13th birthday, a sunburst Gibson Melody Maker, accompanied by a Fender Champ amplifier, and was influenced by guitarists such as Jimmy Reed.

While attending Warner Brothers' art school in Hollywood, California, Gibbons engaged with his first bands including the Saints, Billy G & the Blueflames, and the Coachmen. By 18, Gibbons formed an artfully designed band, conceptually inspired by friend and fellow musician, Roky Erickson and the 13th Floor Elevators, naming the group the Moving Sidewalks, penning the hit single "99th Floor", and engaging in a friendship with Jimi Hendrix.

== Musical career ==
=== Moving Sidewalks ===
Gibbons founded the Texas psychedelic group the Moving Sidewalks, which recorded several singles and one full-length album, Flash. Gibbons and the Moving Sidewalks came to prominence opening for the Jimi Hendrix Experience during Hendrix's first American tour as a headliner. Also notable was the Gibbons-penned song, "99th Floor", its title a nod to the influence on Gibbons of fellow Texans and pioneering psychedelic band the 13th Floor Elevators. He has also commented during live performances while playing the string-bending intro to "Foxy Lady" that Hendrix taught him how to play when Gibbons was "about 17" in Dallas.

=== ZZ Top ===
Gibbons formed ZZ Top in late 1969, and quickly settled on bassist/vocalist Dusty Hill and drummer Frank "Rube" Beard, both members of the band American Blues. After honing their trademark blues-rock style, they released ZZ Top's First Album on London Records in 1971.

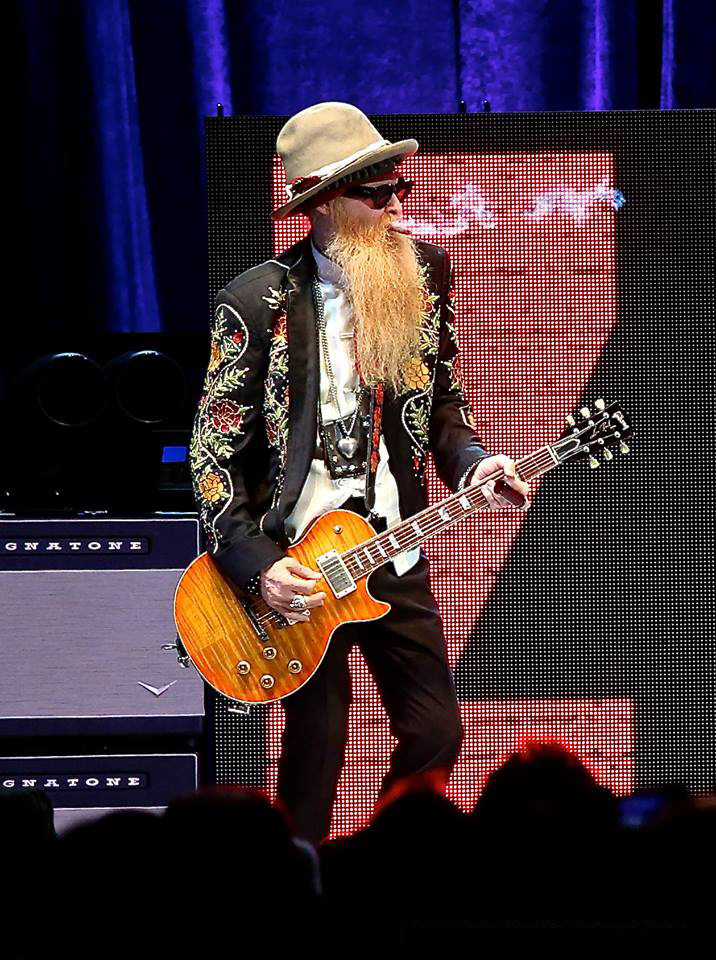
Gibbons at The Alamodome in San Antonio, Texas, 2013

=== Solo career ===
On July 31, 2015, it was announced that Gibbons' solo project would be named Billy Gibbons and the BFG's featuring musicians Mike Flanigin, GG Maartine (née Martine GuiGui), Joe Hardy and Greg Morrow. Their debut album, Perfectamundo, was released on November 6, 2015.

Gibbons' second solo album, The Big Bad Blues, was released on September 21, 2018, via Concord Records. At the 40th Blues Music Awards in May 2019, the album was named as 'Blues Rock Album of the Year'.

In a 2019 interview with Guitar World, Gibbons said that he was already starting to work on his next solo release: "I think we're going to call it Hardware, and that's in tribute to Joe Hardy, our stalwart engineer for four decades. He recently passed on, but in his wake he left the instruction manual -- 'Here's how to do it.' We're still trying to get to the back chapters. It goes deep." The album was released in 2021.

=== Other music-related appearances ===
Gibbons added guitar to the track "Dias Raros" from Diamante Eléctrico of Bogotá, Colombia. He played the first slide guitar lead on the song "Dead End Streets" on Al Jourgensen of Ministry's side project Revolting Cocks album Cocked and Loaded. He wrote, played guitar on and sang "Willin' for Satisfaction" from Def Leppard guitarist Vivian Campbell's 2005 solo album Two Sides of If.

Gibbons collaborated with the Queens of the Stone Age on the song "Burn the Witch" from the album Lullabies to Paralyze. ZZ Top's "Precious and Grace" was recorded with lead vocals provided by Mark Lanegan as a bonus track for the album. Gibbons has claimed this was one of his favorite collaborations and "Precious and Grace" was later added back into ZZ Top's set lists. Gibbons was selected to guest the follow-up album Era Vulgaris but was unable due to scheduling conflicts.

In 2007, Gibbons was featured in the documentary feature film The 1959 Burst alongside Les Paul guitar legends like Slash, Rick Nielsen and Eric Johnson

Together with the Raconteurs Gibbons performed at the 2006 MTV Video Music Awards. Gibbons was part of an ensemble chosen to play with the band, which included Lou Reed and Jim Jarmusch. The performance was heavily edited and cut short by MTV for broadcast.

Gibbons was one of several artists to join B. B. King on the song "Tired of Your Jive", from the B.B. King & Friends - 80 album. He appeared on Nickelback's album All the Right Reasons on the songs "Follow You Home", "Fight for All the Wrong Reasons" and "Rockstar". He also performed with Hank Williams III on the song "Trashville" from his album Lovesick, Broke and Driftin'.

Gibbons collaborated with Les Paul with his Les Paul & Friends American Made, World Played track "Bad Case of Loving You". Gibbons also performed guitar with John Mayall & Friends' track "Put It Right Back" from the album Along for the Ride. He was the first artist to appear on stage at Cleveland's State theater in November 2008 at the American Music Master Tribute to Les Paul, honoring the guitar and recording innovator, who died a few months later.

Gibbons was a guest vocalist on Kid Rock's "Hillbilly Stomp" from the album Kid Rock.

Gibbons was the guitarist during singer Luis Fonsi's presentation at the seventh Latin Grammy awards held in Madison Square Garden, New York, on November 2, 2006.

Gibbons sang background vocals on Sammy Hagar's 2008 CD Cosmic Universal Fashion during the song "Switch on the Light".

Gibbons collaborated with Brooks & Dunn, playing guitar and singing along on their song, "Honky Tonk Stomp".

Gibbons played guitar on "Broke Down on the Brazos", the opening track of Gov't Mule's 2009 album By a Thread.

Gibbons played guitar on "Run Rudolph Run", the third track of We Wish you a Metal Xmas and a Headbanging New Year compilation.

Gibbons joined Jeff Beck onstage at the 2009 25th Anniversary Rock & Roll Hall of Fame Concert with a version of Jimi Hendrix's "Foxy Lady".

Gibbons made a special guest appearance behind Roky Erickson on Austin City Limits taped on November 12, 2007, and originally aired January 12, 2008. (ACL Season 33, Episode 12).

Gibbons plays lead guitar on two songs from the 2008 Everlast album Love, War and the Ghost of Whitey Ford: "Stone in My Hand" and "Anyone".

On January 22, 2010, Gibbons joined Ben Harper, Beck, Conan O'Brien and others on the final episode of The Tonight Show with Conan O'Brien playing a Will Ferrell-led rendition of Lynyrd Skynyrd's "Free Bird".

On February 19, 2011, Gibbons appeared as a guest judge at the 5th Annual Misprint Beard and Moustache Contest at the Mohawk Club in Austin, Texas. Also in 2011 Gibbons appeared on the Leslie West album Unusual Suspects, playing lead guitar on the track "Standing On Higher Ground."

On December 15, 2012, Gibbons made a guest appearance at Social Distortion's concert at the House of Blues on the Sunset Strip. Frontman Mike Ness brought him out for two songs, "Drug Train" and "Black Magic". On November 19, 2014, Gibbons performed "Baby Please Don't Go" at the Václav Havel bust dedication ceremony in the US Capitol.

Gibbons appeared on Buddy Guy's 2015 album Born To Play Guitar, sharing guitar and vocals with Guy on the track "Wear You Out." That same year Gibbons appeared on Shemekia Copeland's album Outskirts of Love, contributing lead guitar on a cover of the ZZ Top classic "Jesus Just Left Chicago."

A 2016 self-titled album by Tim Montana and The Shrednecks features Gibbons on several songs. Later, in 2026, Gibbons would appear with Slash (musician) on Montana's Entire State of Tim Montana, performing a cover version of the ZZ Top classic "Brown Sugar."

Gibbons appears on Alice Cooper's 2017 album Paranormal on the track "Fallen In Love." 2017 also saw an appearance by Gibbons on "Broken Heart", a track from the album Californisoul by Supersonic Blues Machine.

William Shatner's 2018 Christmas album Shatner Claus features Gibbons' guitar on "Rudolph the Red-Nosed Reindeer."

Texas, a 2019 album by Rodney Crowell, features Gibbons on the song "56 Fury."

In 2020, Gibbons was featured playing guitar on Chapel Hart's single titled "Jesus & Alcohol", and also plays the role of a pastor in the music video.

In November 2021, Gibbons appeared alongside Dion DiMucci on "My Stomping Ground", which was featured in DiMucci's Stomping Ground album. Gibbons also performed on several songs on Mick Fleetwood's 2021 live album Mick Fleetwood and Friends Celebrate The Music of Peter Green and The Early Years of Fleetwood Mac (Live From The London Palladium).

Dropout Boogie, a 2022 album by The Black Keys, features Gibbons on the track "Good Love." Also in 2022 Gibbons appeared on the Edgar Winter album Brother Johnny, playing alongside Derek Trucks on the track "I'm Yours and I'm Hers."

Gibbons contributed vocals and guitar on the song "Shake Our Way Out" on the 2023 Gov't Mule album Peace...Like a River.

Gibbons next featured on the song "Payback Time" by The Fabulous Thunderbirds on their album Struck Down, released in June of 2024. He is also featured on lead guitar throughout the album Friendlytown, released in August of 2024 by Steve Cropper & the Midnight Hour. Also in 2024 he appeared on Orgy of The Damned, a blues covers album by Slash (musician) and friends, performing on the Willie Dixon classic "Hoochie Coochie Man."

== Other projects ==
=== Television ===
Gibbons had a recurring role on the Fox network TV series Bones, appearing in seven episodes over nine years. He plays a fictionalized version of himself, as the father of Michaela Conlin's character, Angela Pearly Gates Montenegro. He is never referred to by name on the show, though; every mention is limited to "Angela's father." Conlin's character's middle name is the same as Gibbons' Les Paul guitar. His character is extremely protective of his daughter. He often "threatens" or "haunts" Angela's husband and colleague Dr. Jack Hodgins, telling him that if he hurts Angela, he will pay. When Angela and Hodgins first broke up, he drugged and kidnapped Hodgins, tattooing him with Angela's face on his left deltoid area. After Angela discovers the tattoo, she informs Hodgins she wants it removed (although he never removed it). Once she discovers it was her father's doing she angrily exclaimed, "I am so going to kick his Texan bad ass." He appeared in several other episodes of Bones, including one where he asks Hodgins to help him recover his car from some "biker hoods". In his next appearance, he argued with Hodgins over baby names. He wanted the child to be named "Staccato Mamba", which came to him in a song, while Angela and Hodgins wanted to name him "Michael Vincent" (the parents and grandfather compromised on "Michael Staccato").

Gibbons, along with ZZ Top bandmates Dusty Hill and Frank Beard, voiced a fictionalized version of himself in Fox's animated show King of the Hill, which is set in the fictional town of Arlen, Texas. In the show, Dusty Hill is said to be a cousin of the show's main character, Hank Hill.

=== Books ===
Gibbons co-wrote the book Billy F Gibbons: Rock + Roll Gearhead with author Tom Vickers, first published in 2005. The book is divided into three sections: The Life, The Cars, and The Guitars. The first section is a biography of Gibbons, while the latter two sections showcase his car and guitar collections, respectively. In 2020, Motorbooks published an expanded reissue of the book to commemorate the 50th anniversary of ZZ Top.

=== BFG Brand sauces ===
In 2011, Gibbons joined with Texas-based Mojo Products, LLC, to launch a line of hot sauces, barbecue sauces, and other products with his own personal branding, "BFG Brand". The sauces were sold as BFG No. 44 via his personal website.

In late 2012, Gibbons was featured in a series of television commercials for Fiesta Mart, a Texas supermarket chain. Some of the BFG Brand sauces were seen in these commercials.

=== Session work ===
In 2018, Billy Gibbons teamed up with John Fogerty. During the planning of Fogerty and ZZ Top's coheadlining summer Blues and Bayous Tour, Fogerty wrote a song with Gibbons entitled "The Holy Grail" which Gibbons appeared on adding vocals and some guitar. Gibbons had this to say to Billboard Magazine: "It's not an overstatement to say that writing a song with John Fogerty is a genuine bonus. It's fair to say that John and I are both pumped about our collaboration and we think this new one called 'The Holy Grail' holds true with some great storytelling and some solid guitar movin' the number right along. It begs a shout of, 'Turn it up!'" The single "The Holy Grail" was released on June 8, 2018.

== Equipment ==
=== Guitars ===
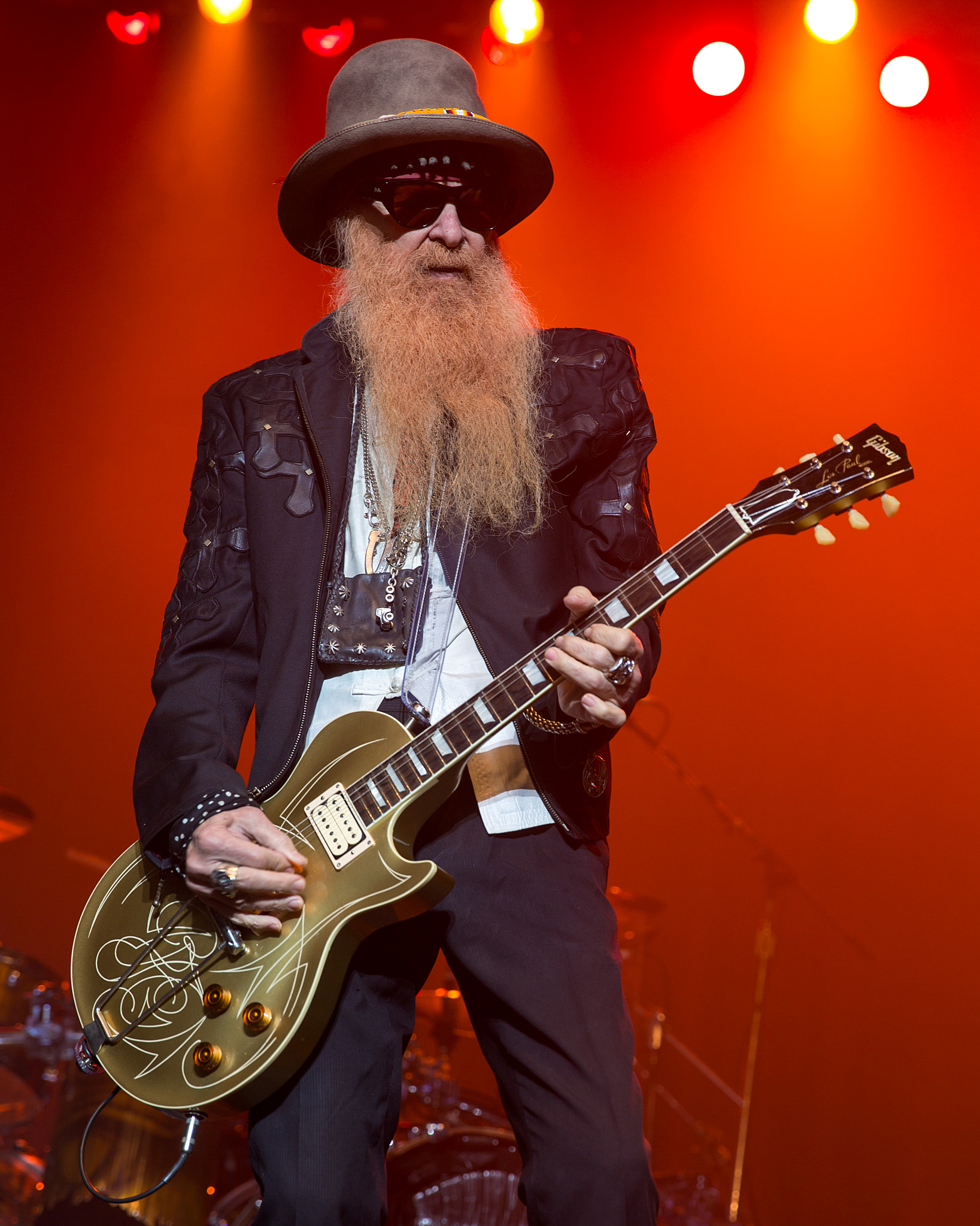
Gibbons performing in San Antonio, Texas, in 2015

Gibbons primarily plays Gibson guitars. His first guitar was a sunburst 1962 Gibson Melody Maker. In 1968, Gibbons acquired a sunburst 1959 Gibson Les Paul Standard guitar from a farmer in Houston, Texas, for $250 (equivalent to $2,315 in 2025). The guitar was named Pearly Gates, a name taken from the dangerous-to-drive "rolling-wreck" automobile that he sold to buy the guitar. The guitar has become the foundation/benchmark of every ZZ Top album since the group formed in 1969.

Gibbons also plays Fender guitars. During his stint in the Moving Sidewalks, Gibbons used a white 1963 Fender Jazzmaster and Fender Esquire. He has also used an extremely rare "Gretsch Jupiter Thunderbird" given to him by Bo Diddley. The use of this guitar (beginning with the 2003 ZZ Top album Mescalero) inspired a signature production model, the Gretsch Billy-Bo Jupiter Thunderbird. For Mescalero, Gibbons also relied heavily on Ulrich Teuffel's futuristic Birdfish guitar, saying it was second only to Pearly Gates. According to Gibbons, "It really shines on Mescalero because of that dirty, raunchy tone. I defy any other instrument, besides these odd-ball things, to get that crazy." Gibbons recorded Eliminator using a Dean ML guitar.

For the music video for the 1983 single "Legs", Gibbons and Hill used matching spinning sheepskin fur guitars made by Dean Zelinsky of Dean Guitars. The guitars are attached to the belt buckles with a rotary electrical contact and strap mount, allowing them to spin. Gibbons credited the spinning idea to Moving Sidewalks bassist Don Summers.

Gibbons worked with Thomas Nilsen of Cream T Pickups to create the BFG Banger humbucker pickup. At the January 2010 NAMM Show, Dunlop Manufacturing and Gibbons unveiled a new line of guitar accessories, Rev. Willy's. These include Gibbons-inspired picks, strings, and slides.

=== Strings ===
Gibbons notably uses strings in an extra light gauge of .007-.009-.011-.020-.030-.038 on his guitars and has a signature set manufactured and sold by Dunlop known as "Rev. Willy's Mexican Lottery Brand". The company also manufactures other gauges of these strings.

Originally a user of heavy gauge strings in ZZ Top's earliest days, Gibbons switched to light strings after playing a show with B. B. King. King asked to play Gibbons' guitar, which he gladly obliged. After playing it, King noticed the heavy strings, handed the guitar back to Gibbons and asked, "Why you working so hard?" Gibbons had assumed that the classic blues sound came from playing heavy gauge strings, but King told him otherwise and advised him to put light gauge strings on his guitar instead.

=== Amplifiers ===
Gibbons has used a variety of Marshall products, including the JCM 900 Dual Reverb, Bluesbreaker, JTM45, Major, and Lead 12. Recently, his live touring rack consists of the JMP-1 Preamp, combined with power amps such as the Valvestate 120 or the 9200 model. Gibbons has a large collection of vintage Fender amplifiers (his first amp was a Fender Champ), and collects Fender Dual Professionals. Other Fenders he has used include a Fender Bassman and Fender Tweed Deluxe. Gibbons has been using Magnatone amplifiers since around 2014.

== Personal life ==
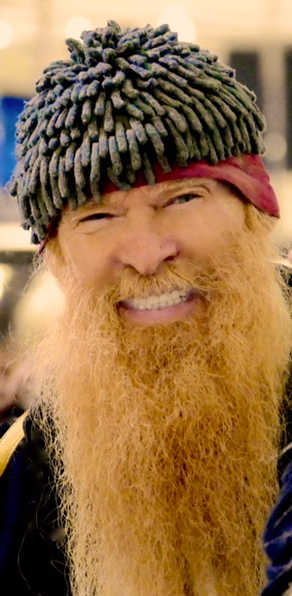
Gibbons c. 2016

On December 14, 2005, Gibbons married longtime girlfriend Gilligan Stillwater (born Ellen J. Oetjen).

Gibbons is an avid car collector and custom car enthusiast with an extensive collection that includes a 1948 Cadillac Series 62 (known as CadZZilla), a 1962 Chevrolet Impala (known as "Slampala"), a 1950 Ford Business Coupe, and a 1958 Ford Thunderbird. One of his earliest custom cars, a 1933 Ford Coupe (known as "Eliminator"), was featured in three of ZZ Top's music videos and is also on the cover of their 1983 album, also titled Eliminator. Gibbons also published a book in 2011 about his love of cars and guitars titled Billy F Gibbons: Rock + Roll Gearhead. The November 2014 issue of Guitar World magazine featured an interview with Gibbons and fellow guitarist Jeff Beck about their mutual appreciation of "cars, guitars, and everything in between".

For several years, Gibbons has appeared wearing a braided-cloth cap rather than his familiar Stetson hat. During a visit to Vienna, he met the chief of the Bamileke people from Cameroon, with whom he traded the hat for the cap.

== Discography ==
=== Studio albums ===
Title	Album details	Peak chart position							
Title	Album details	US	US Blues	US Rock	AUT	CAN	GER	SWI	UK
Perfectamundo (as Billy Gibbons and The BFG's)	Released: November 6, 2015; Label: Concord; Format: record, CD, download, streaming	48	1	2	—	72	66	12	62
The Big Bad Blues	Released: September 21, 2018; Label: Concord; Format: record, CD, download, streaming	73	2	9	19	80	8	4	19
Hardware	Released: June 4, 2021; Label: Concord; Format: record, CD, download, streaming	111	—	17	8	—	4	1	18
"—" denotes releases that did not chart

=== Singles ===
==== As lead artist ====
Year	Title	Album
2018	"Rollin' And Tumblin'"	The Big Bad Blues
2019	"Hot Rod"	Non-album single
2021	"West Coast Junkie"	Hardware
2021	"Desert High"	Hardware
2021	"My Lucky Card"	Hardware
2021	"Jingle Bell Blues"	Non-album single

==== As featured artist ====
Year	Title	Peak chart position		Album
Year	Title	US Country	US Hot 100	Album
2009	"Honky Tonk Stomp" (Brooks & Dunn featuring Billy F. Gibbons)	16	96	#1s... and Then Some
2020	"Jesus & Alcohol" (Chapel Hart featuring Gibbons on guitar)	—	—	The Girls Are Back in Town
2020	"Bam Bang Boom" (Dion featuring Gibbons on guitar)	—	—	Blues with Friends
2021	"My Stomping Ground" (Dion featuring Billy F. Gibbons)	—	—	Stomping Ground
2022	"Too Much Girl 4 Me" (Morris Day featuring Billy F. Gibbons)	—	—	Last Call

=== Appearances on various artists compilations ===
Year of release	Compilation	Song
2008	We Wish You a Metal Xmas and a Headbanging New Year	"Run Rudolph Run" (with Lemmy and Dave Grohl)

=== Music videos ===
Year	Video	Director
2009	"Honky Tonk Stomp" (Brooks & Dunn featuring Billy F. Gibbons)	Thein Phan
2015	"Treat Her Right"	Adam Rothlein
2020	"Jesus & Alcohol" (Chapel Hart with "The Rev." Billy F. Gibbons)	David Abbott
2021	"West Coast Junkie"	Harry Reese
2021	"Desert High"	Harry Reese
