= Larkin Poe =

American roots rock duo

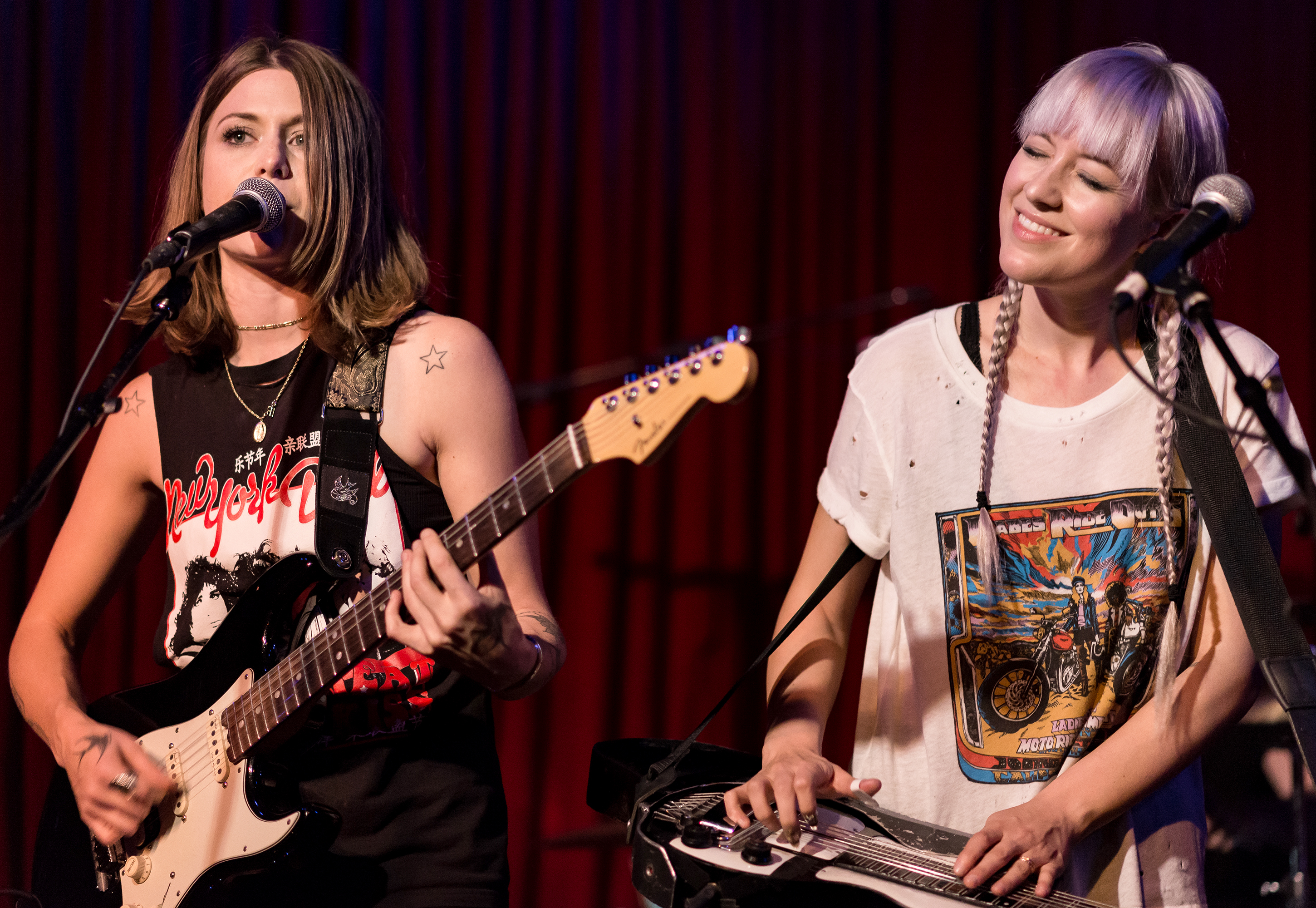
- Larkin Poe performing at Hotel Cafe in Los Angeles in 2017

Background information
- Origin: Calhoun, Georgia, U.S.
- Genres: Southern rock; blues rock; folk rock
- Years active: 2010–present
- Labels: RH Music; Tricki-Woo
- Members: Rebecca Lovell; Megan Lovell
- Website: larkinpoe.com

Larkin Poe is an American roots rock duo led by sisters Rebecca Lovell and Megan Lovell. The band originated in north Georgia and is based in Nashville, Tennessee. Known for their strong southern harmonies, heavy electric guitar riffs, and steel guitar, Larkin Poe often draws comparisons to the style of the Allman Brothers. The Lovell sisters have gained recognition for their energetic performances and musical prowess.

The band's history began with the Lovell Sisters, an acoustic music trio formed in 2005 with their older sister, Jessica Lovell. After releasing independent albums and touring for four years, the Lovell Sisters disbanded in 2010. Later that year, Rebecca and Megan Lovell regrouped as Larkin Poe, taking their band name from their great-great-great-great-grandfather, a cousin of Edgar Allan Poe.

Larkin Poe's early years saw the release of several independent extended plays (EPs) and collaborative albums. They signed a recording contract with RH Music in late 2013 and released their debut studio album, Kin, in 2014. The band gained recognition for their collaboration with producer T Bone Burnett on the New Basement Tapes' album Lost on the River: The New Basement Tapes. The band performed at the 2014 and 2016 Glastonbury Festival and were voted "Best Discovery of Glastonbury 2014" by the UK's The Observer.

Their musical journey continued with the release of albums Peach in 2017, Venom & Faith (Grammy Nominated) in 2018, and Self Made Man in 2020, which achieved notable success on the Billboard Top Blues Albums chart. In addition to their original music, Larkin Poe released a covers album titled Kindred Spirits in 2020, showcasing their interpretations of songs by various artists. In 2022, they released Blood Harmony, which won the 2024 Grammy Award for Best Contemporary Blues Album. 2025 saw the release of the album Bloom.

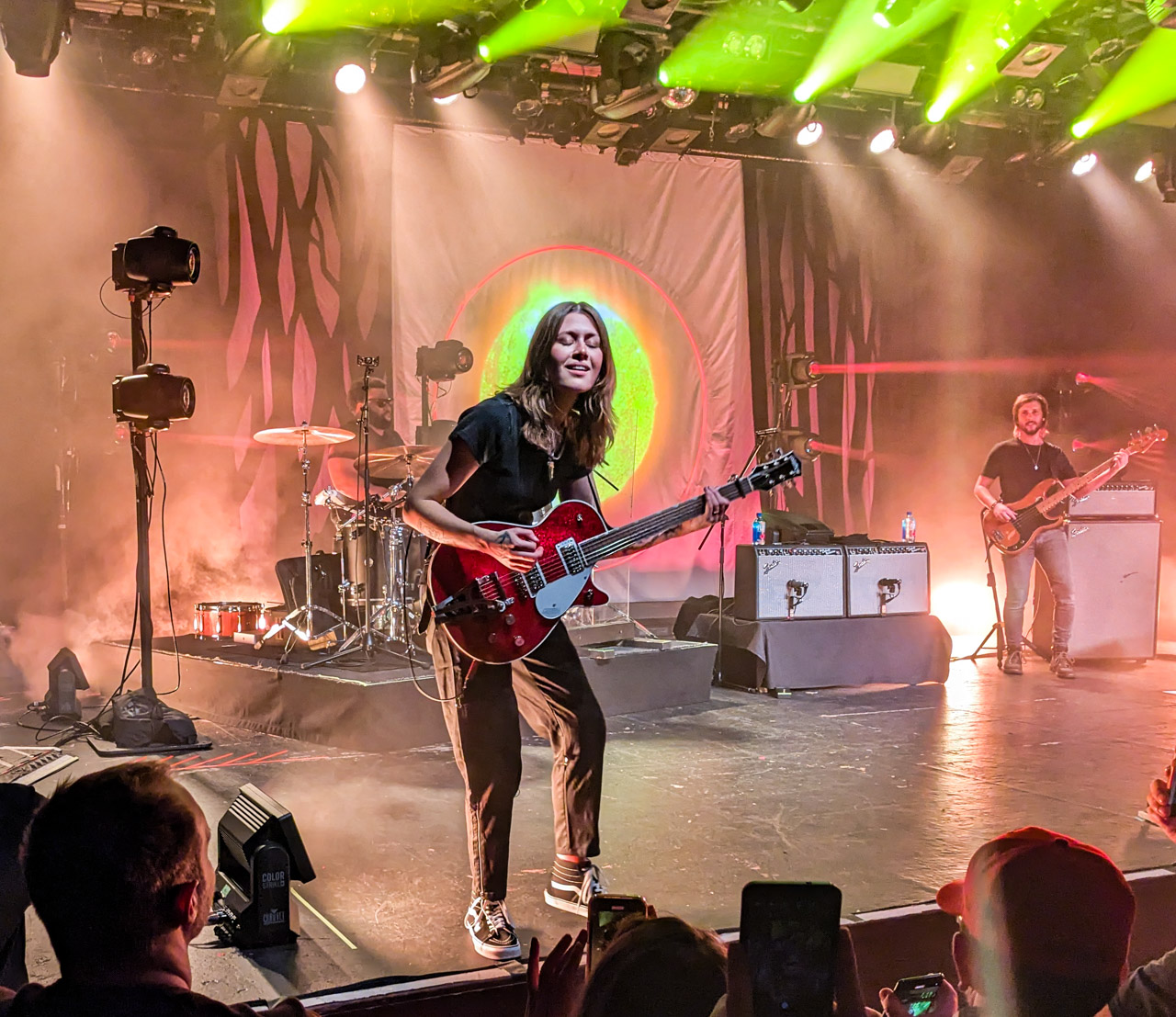
Rebecca Lovell at Commodore Ballroom in Vancouver, Canada, February 2023

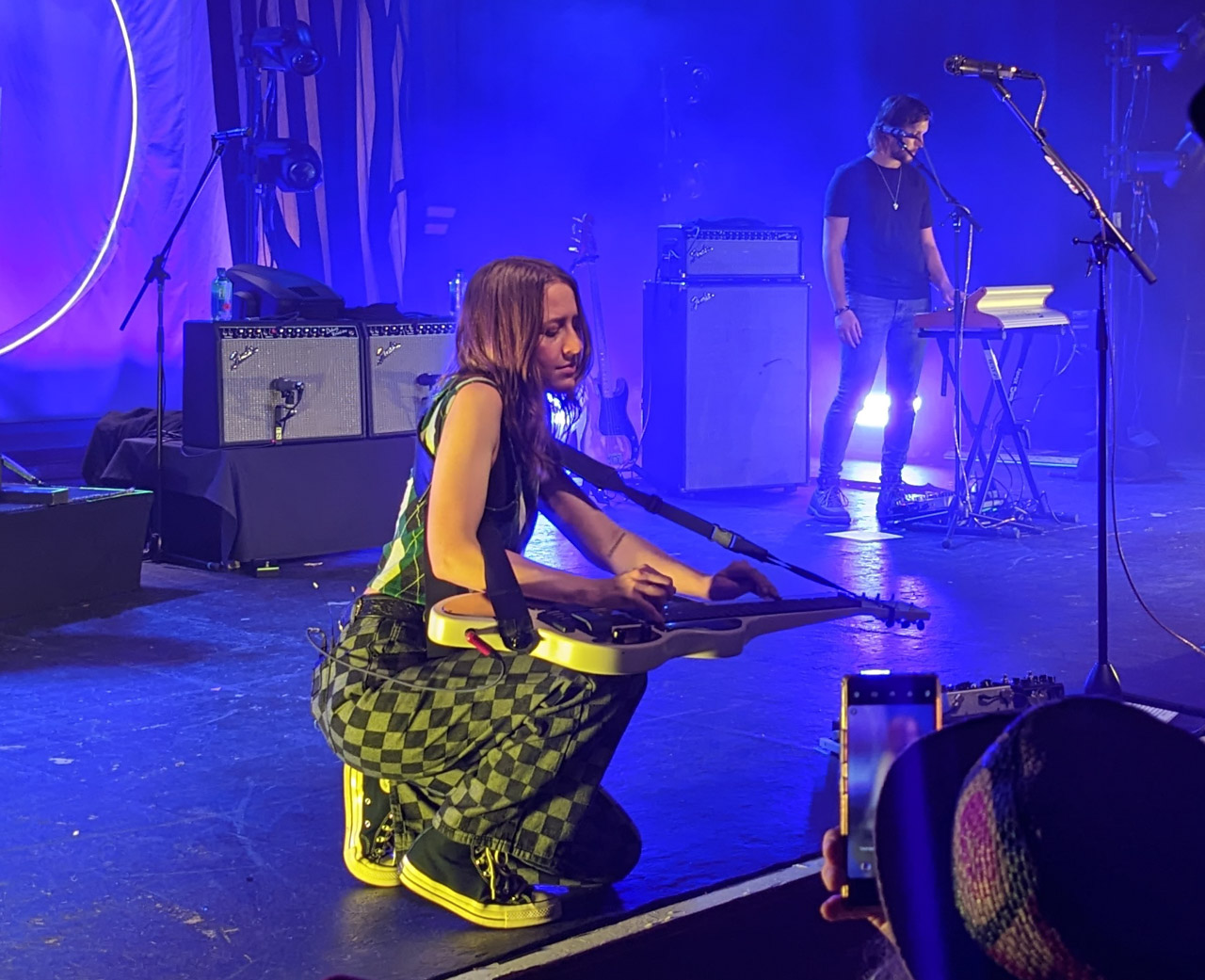
Megan Lovell kneeling to play at Commodore Ballroom in Vancouver, Canada, February 2023

== Career ==
Rebecca and Megan Lovell began their musical careers in 2005 as teenagers with the formation of acoustic music trio, the Lovell Sisters, with their older sister, Jessica Lovell. After self-releasing two independent albums and touring successfully for four years – appearing on Garrison Keillor's A Prairie Home Companion, the Grand Ole Opry, and performing at Bonnaroo Music Festival – the group announced their disbandment in December 2009. In January 2010, Rebecca and Megan regrouped as Larkin Poe. "Larkin Poe" was the name of the sisters' great-great-great-great-grandfather.

Over the course of 3 years (2010–2013), Larkin Poe self-released 5 independent EPs, 2 collaborative albums, and a live performance DVD. Spring EP (2010), Summer EP (2010), Fall EP (2010), Winter EP (2010), Thick as Thieves EP (2011), The Sound of the Ocean Sound a collaboration with Thom Hell (2013), Killing Time EP a collaboration with Blair Dunlop (2013).

In late 2013, Larkin Poe signed a recording contract with RH Music, the music division of San Francisco-based company Restoration Hardware. Following this signing, the band began work on their debut studio album, Kin, which was released in 2014.

In March 2014, producer T Bone Burnett tapped the sisters to record harmonies and instrumentation on the New Basement Tapes' album Lost on the River: The New Basement Tapes alongside Marcus Mumford of Mumford & Sons, Elvis Costello, Jim James of My Morning Jacket, Taylor Goldsmith of Dawes, and Rhiannon Giddens. Rebecca and Megan also appear in the 2014 Showtime documentary Lost Songs: The Basement Tapes Continued.

In June 2014, Larkin Poe performed at the Glastonbury Festival, which resulted in them being named "best discovery of Glastonbury" by The Observer.

In April 2016, Larkin Poe reissued their debut studio album under the title Reskinned, with a different order of songs and 5 new tracks replacing songs from the original version. They performed their song "Trouble in Mind" on Conan. They also appeared on Steven Tyler's studio album We're All Somebody from Somewhere, which was released in July of the same year.

In February 2017, Larkin Poe performed as part of the backing band at the MusiCares tribute to Tom Petty in Los Angeles, accompanying such artists as Jackson Browne and Don Henley of the Eagles.

Larkin Poe's cover version of the traditional song "John the Revelator" was used as the Series 3 episode 13 ending music for the Fox TV series Lucifer.

In 2017, Larkin Poe released their self-produced sophomore album, Peach, which was nominated for the Blues Foundation Best Emerging Artist Album in 2018.

Larkin Poe released their third studio album, Venom & Faith, on November 9, 2018. The album was recorded in Nashville, produced by Rebecca and Megan, and engineered and mixed by Roger Alan Nichols. Venom & Faith reached #1 on the Billboard blues album chart for the week of November 24, 2018. The album was nominated for the 2020 Grammy Award for Best Contemporary Blues Album.

Larkin Poe played at the 2020 Mahindra Blues Festival in Mumbai, India. Relatively unknown in that part of the world, the duo impressed with their rendition of "When God Closes a Door", and premiered the title track from their next album.

Larkin Poe's fourth studio album Self Made Man was released on June 12, 2020, on Tricki-Woo Records. The lead single, "She's a Self Made Man", was released in March 2020. Self Made Man reached #1 on the Billboard blues album chart for the week of June 27, 2020, making it their second consecutive number-one album.

On November 20, 2020, Larkin Poe released their fifth studio album, Kindred Spirits, a covers album featuring renditions of songs by Lenny Kravitz, Neil Young, Elvis Presley, Phil Collins, Elton John, and others. On November 11, 2022, they released their sixth studio album, Blood Harmony. Blood Harmony would go on to win the 2024 Grammy Award for Best Contemporary Blues Album.

On January 22, 2025 they released the album Bloom. The album was co-produced by Rebecca Lovell, Megan Lovell, and Tyler Bryant.

== Band members ==
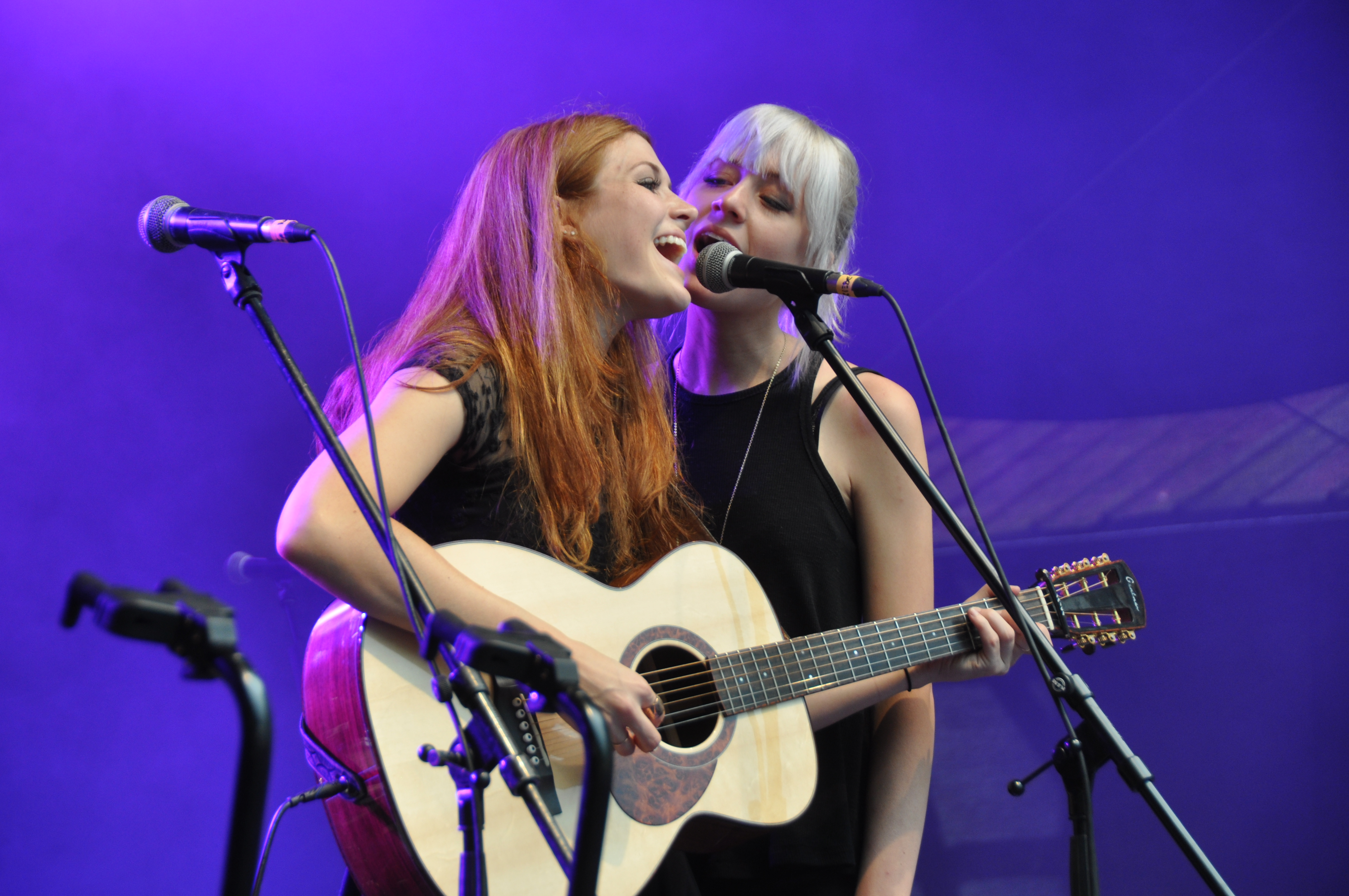
Rebecca and Megan Lovell at Blacksheep Festival 2014

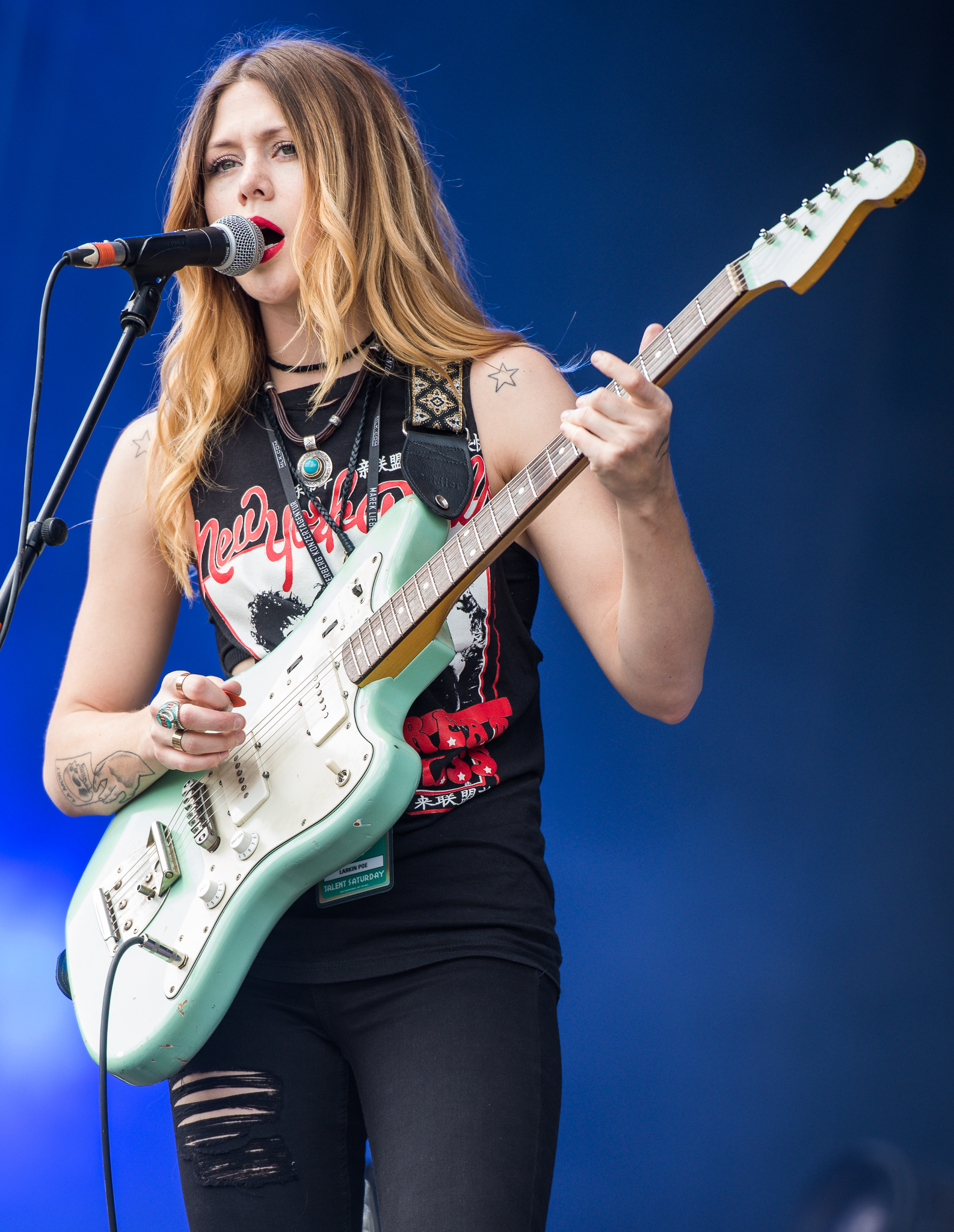
Rebecca Lovell at Rock im Park 2016

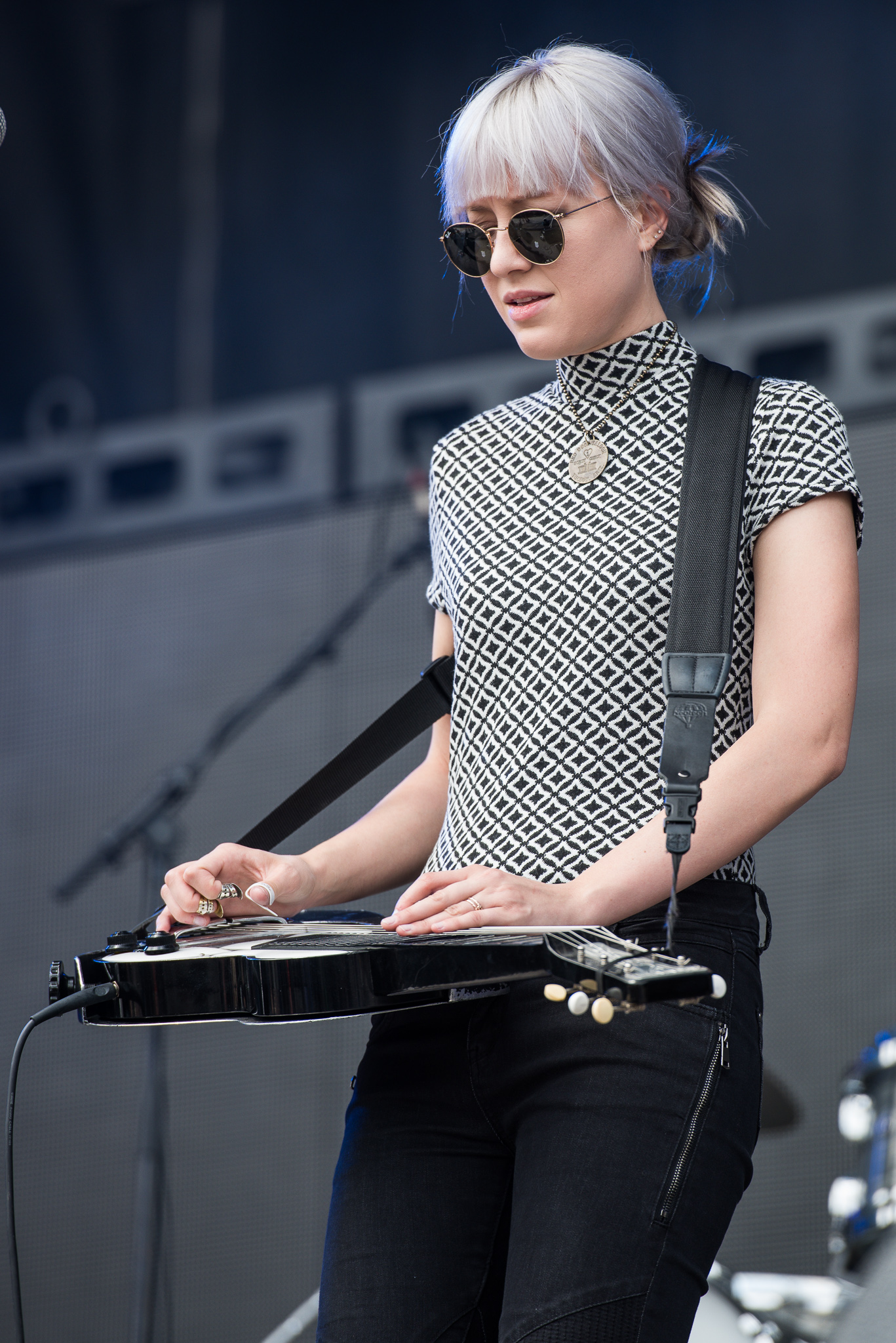
Megan Lovell at Rock im Park 2016

- Rebecca Lovell – lead vocals, electric guitar, acoustic guitar, mandolin, banjo, violin, piano; drum programming, bass and arrangements
- Megan Lovell – harmony vocals, lap steel, dobro

== Discography ==
=== Studio albums ===
- Kin (2014) RH Music
- Reskinned (2016) RH Music; Vertigo/Universal/We Love Music; Tricki-Woo Records (reissue/re-release of Kin with 5 tracks replaced by new recordings)
- Peach (2017) Tricki-Woo
- Venom & Faith (2018) Tricki-Woo
- Self Made Man (2020) Tricki-Woo
- Kindred Spirits (2020) Tricki-Woo
- Blood Harmony (2022) Tricki-Woo
- Bloom (2025) Tricki-Woo

=== Live albums ===
- Paint the Roses with Nu Deco Ensemble (2021) Tricki-Woo Records

=== EPs ===
- Spring (2010) Edvins Records (sold in the US as Larkin Poe via 2Defpig)
- Summer (2010) Edvins
- Fall (2010) Edvins
- Winter (2010) Edvins
- Thick as Thieves (2011) Edvins
- Killing Time with Blair Dunlop (2013) Rooksmere Records
- Audiotree Live (2017) Audiotree (digital release only)
- An Acoustic Companion (2023) Tricki-Woo

=== Box sets ===
- Band for All Seasons (2010) Edvins Records; 2Defpig (contains 4 EPs: Spring, Summer, Fall, and Winter)

=== DVDs ===
- Thick as Thieves [Special Edition]: Live from Stongfjordenn (2012) Edvins Records

=== Collaborations ===
- The Sound of the Ocean Sound with Thom Hell (2013) Edvins Records
- Killing Time [EP] with Blair Dunlop (2013) Rooksmere Records
- Paint the Roses with Nu Deco Ensemble (2021) Tricki-Woo Records

=== Soundtracks ===
- Sweetwater (Original Motion Picture Soundtrack) (2023) Candid Records (songs: Get Up, Right Place Right Time )
- Queen of the Ring (2025 film) Original Motion Picture Soundtrack- (song: God’s Gonna Cut You Down)

=== Other appearances ===
- The Rainy Day Sessions [EP] by A Rocket to the Moon (2010)
- Blight and Blossom by Blair Dunlop (2012)
- Shuffle and Deal by Gilmore & Roberts (2012)
- Lost on the River: The New Basement Tapes by the New Basement Tapes (2014)
- Southern Gravity by Kristian Bush (2015)
- Detour: Live at Liverpool Philharmonic Hall by Elvis Costello (2015)
- We're All Somebody from Somewhere by Steven Tyler (2016)
- The Weight by Playing for Change (2019)
- Rattlesnake Shakin' Woman by Ray Wylie Hubbard ft. Larkin Poe (2020)
- Hardware by Billy Gibbons (2021)
- "I Shall Be Released" from Dirt Does Dylan by Nitty Gritty Dirt Band (2022)
- "Done" from Mileage by Ruthie Foster (2024)
- "Rosetta" and "String Theory" from Look Up by Ringo Starr (2025)
- "Come On Up (feat. Larkin Poe)" from Just Say Yes by Ruthie Foster (2026) (also writing credits on most of the album)
