= Tyler Bryant =

American musician (born 1991)

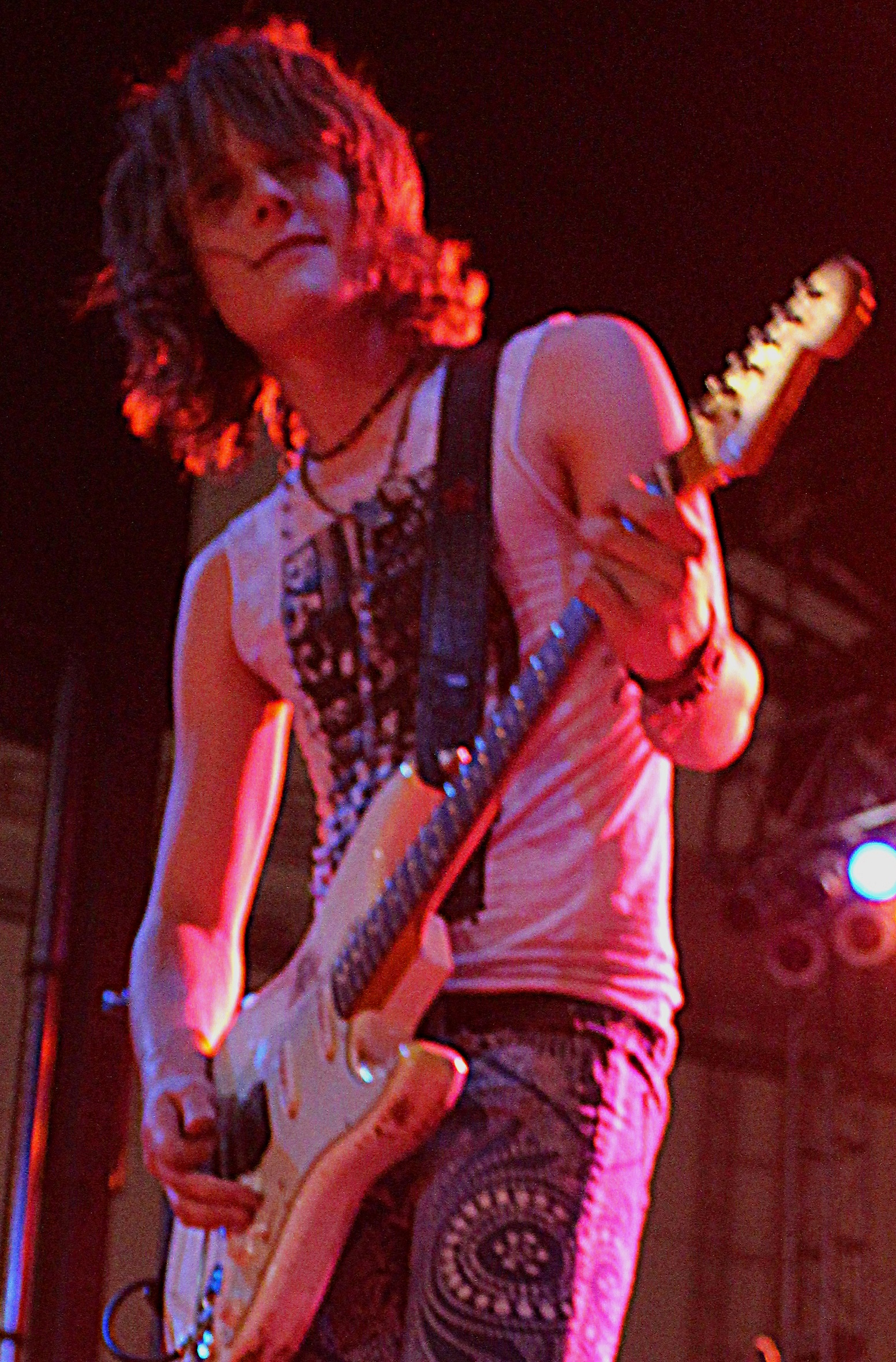
- Bryant in 2016

Background information
- Born: Tyler Dow Bryant; February 24, 1991 (age 35); Paris, Texas, United States
- Genres: Hard rock; blues rock; southern rock; blues (early)
- Occupations: Musician, producer, engineer, songwriter
- Instruments: Vocals, guitar
- Years active: 2002–present
- Member of: Tyler Bryant & the Shakedown
- Formerly of: The Blues Buddies
- Spouse: Rebecca Lovell (m. 2019)
- Website: tylerbryantandtheshakedown.com

Tyler Dow Bryant (born February 24, 1991) is a two-time Grammy Award-winning producer, songwriter, and musician from Honey Grove, Texas. He is best known as the lead guitarist and vocalist of the rock band Tyler Bryant & the Shakedown.

== Early and personal life ==
Bryant got his first guitar at the age of 6. When he was 11, he sold the dirtbike his parents had given to him for Christmas and bought his first electric guitar, a red Epiphone Les Paul from Holly Bond's Music Store in Paris, Texas. While still in elementary school, he met Roosevelt Twitty, a blues musician who became Bryant's guitar mentor. Together Bryant and Twitty formed the Blues Buddies, playing shows around Texas. This was the age that Bryant started writing songs.

At 15, Bryant put together his first band, which performed local shows in and around his hometown. In 2006, he was presented with the Robert Johnson Gibson New Generation Award for aspiring young guitar players. In 2007, Bryant won Ernie Ball's first "Play Crossroads Competition", which got him a spot performing at the Crossroads Guitar Festival in Chicago.

As Bryant's career continued, he began to take influence from blues-based rock acts, such as The Black Crowes, The Rolling Stones, Lynyrd Skynyrd, and Tom Petty and the Heartbreakers. Bryant moved to Nashville at age 17 to pursue a career in songwriting, and in the process he met drummer Caleb Crosby and bass player Calvin Webster. Crosby and Webster joined Bryant's band, named Tyler Bryant & the Shakedown, which now also includes bass guitarist Diego Navaira and guitarist Graham Whitford (the latter being the son of Aerosmith's Brad Whitford).

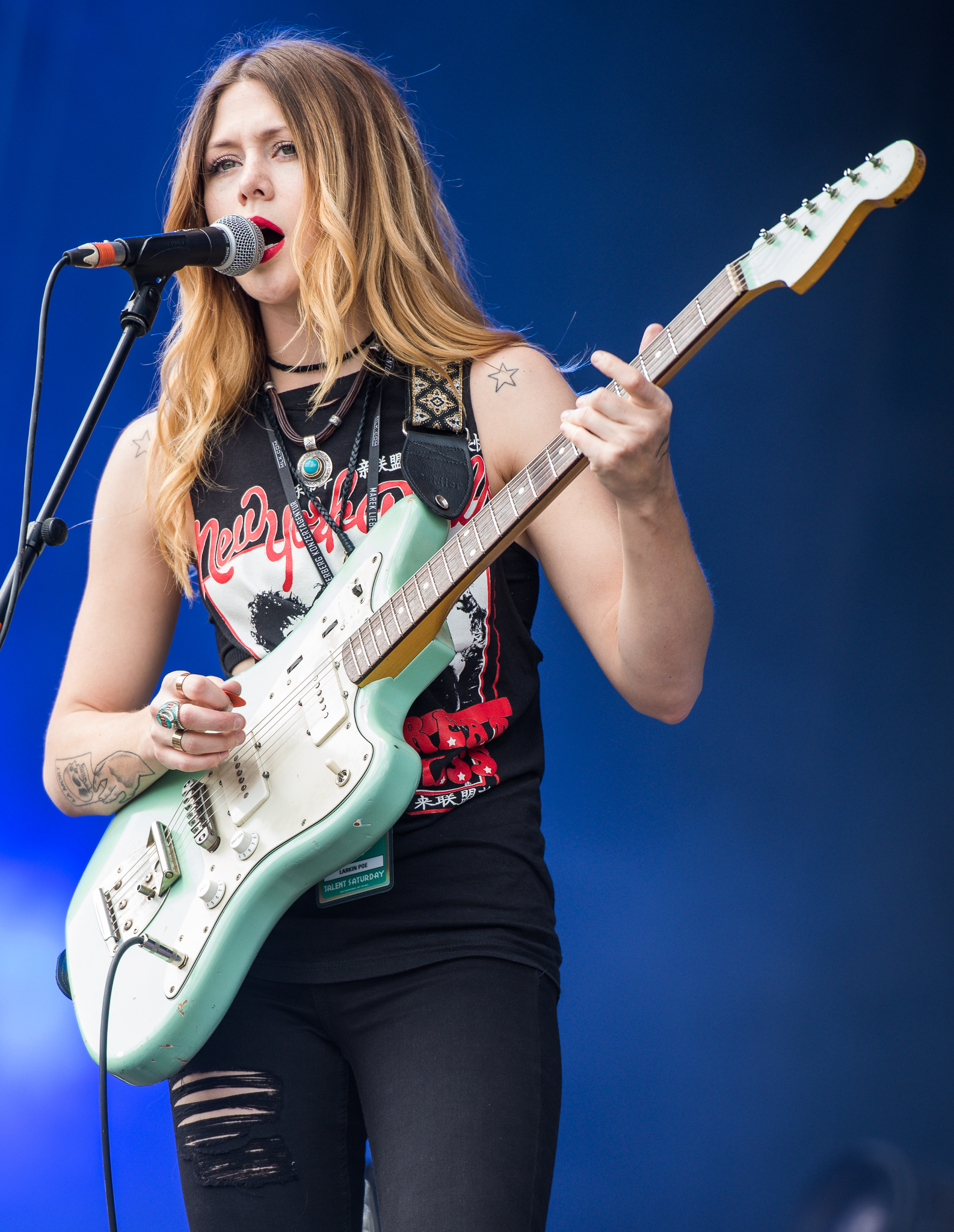
Bryant has been married to Larkin Poe's Rebecca Lovell since 2019

On October 6, 2019, Bryant married Rebecca Lovell of Larkin Poe. In March 2025, they announced they were expecting their first child, a boy.

== Career ==
In 2008, Bryant signed with John Huie at Creative Artists Agency as his booking agent. Bryant has toured with and opened shows for artists including Jeff Beck, Aerosmith, Lynyrd Skynyrd, Joe Bonamassa, B.B. King, Pat Benatar, Heart, Smash Mouth, Styx, REO Speedwagon, AC/DC, Vince Gill, Guns N' Roses and The Cadillac Three. Guitarist Vince Gill has said about Bryant, "To be 18 and play like this kid is the rarest of the rare. Hands down a future guitar god." In 2009, Bryant performed at the Grammy Foundation's 11th Annual Music Preservation Event: "Music in Focus" at the historic Wilshire Ebell Theater in Los Angeles. In 2009, he was featured, along with musicians including Jeff Beck, Carlos Santana and Slash, in the film Rock Prophecies. Bryant's song "Who I Am" is featured as downloadable content for Guitar Hero 5. He performed at the 2011 Austin City Limits Music Festival.

In 2011, Bryant formed Dead Cool Dropouts with Lisa Origliasso of the Veronicas. He later contributed to the latter band's 2014 self-titled album. He contributed to "Sanctified.”

Bryant has recorded with record producers Kevin Shirley, Jed Leiber, Andy Johns, Joe Hamilton, Vance Powell, and Roger Alan Nichols. In March 2011, Bryant released his first EP, called My Radio, which was later followed by another EP, From the Sandcastle. Tyler Bryant & the Shakedown released their debut album Wild Child on January 22, 2013. Their song "Loaded Dice & Buried Money" was available for streaming on October 13, 2015, and an EP titled The Wayside was announced with a release date of November 13, 2015. The present members of the group include Bryant (lead vocals, guitar), Graham Whitford (guitar, backing vocals) and Caleb Crosby (drums).

He released Truth and Lies, his third album, in 2019. his third album. Later works include Pressure (2020), Shake The Roots (2022), Live From ‘79 (2023), and Electrified (2024).

Bryant won the Grammy Award for Best Contemporary Blues Album at the 2023 Grammy Awards for his work on Blood Harmony by Larkin Poe. He won again the following year for producing the album “Mileage” by Ruthie Foster.

== Equipment ==
Bryant is known for using a pink Fender Stratocaster nicknamed "Pinky One", which was stolen and therefore replaced with a similar "Pinky 2". The stolen guitar was found and returned after five and a half years. Bryant's limited edition Fender Custom Shop signature model is based on Pinky 2. He also has a signature amp from Supro.
