= Sandra discography =

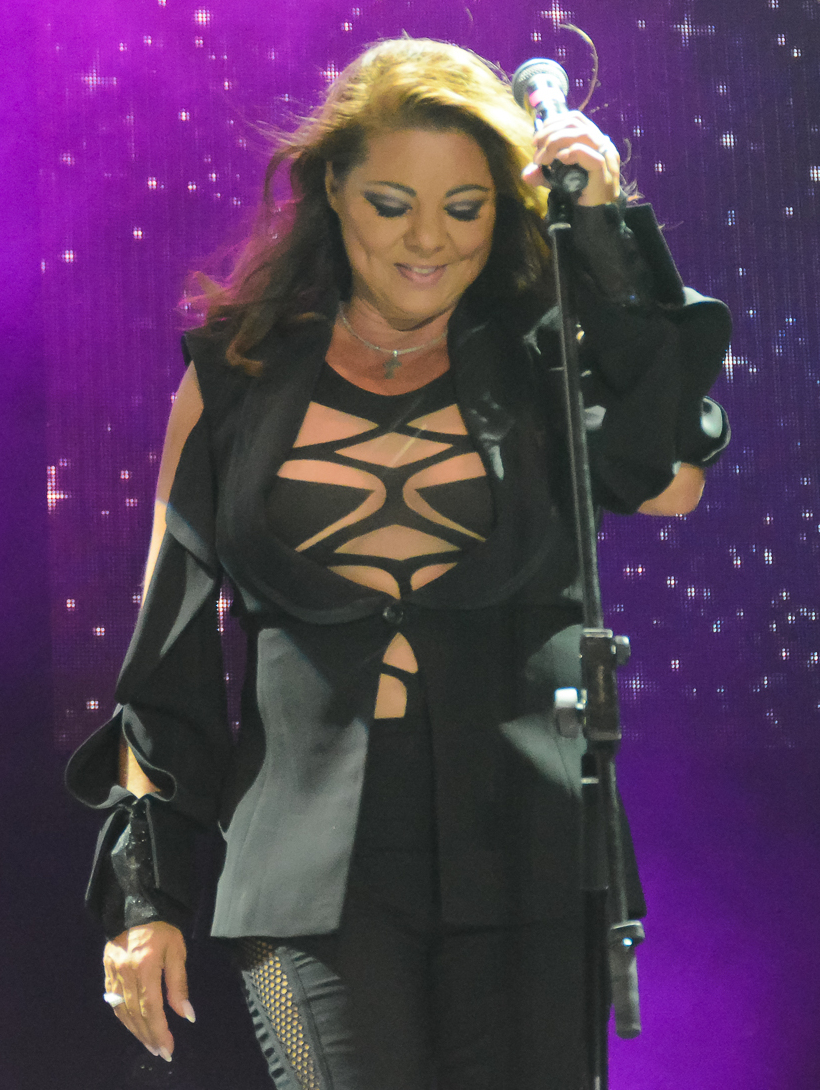
- Sandra performing in 2017
- Studio albums: 10
- Compilation albums: 8
- Singles: 47
- Video albums: 3
- Music videos: 26
- Box sets: 6

The discography of the German singer Sandra consists of 10 studio albums, eight compilation albums and 47 singles, including 10 promotional-only singles. Her videography comprises three long-form video releases and 26 music videos.

After enjoying a considerable success as the lead singer of the disco trio Arabesque, particularly in Japan, Sandra began performing solo in 1984, launching her career with a German-language cover of Alphaville's "Big in Japan". Her breakthrough single was "(I'll Never Be) Maria Magdalena", released in 1985, which topped charts in numerous countries and secured her international fame. With Michael Cretu as her manager, producer and composer, and personally a life partner, Sandra went on to score even more European top 10 hit singles, most famously "In the Heat of the Night" (1985), "Everlasting Love" (1987), "Secret Land" (1988), "Hiroshima" (1990) and "Don't Be Aggressive" (1992). Sandra found biggest popularity in continental Europe, Israel, Japan and Brazil. She has reportedly sold over 30 million records worldwide, which makes her one of the most successful female German vocalists ever.

== Albums ==
=== Studio albums ===
| Title | Album details | Peak chart positions | | | | | | | | | | Certifications |
| Title | Album details | GER | AUT | CZ | FIN | FRA | NLD | NOR | POL | SWE | SWI | Certifications |
|---|---|---|---|---|---|---|---|---|---|---|---|---|
| The Long Play | Released: 11 November 1985; Label: Virgin; Format: CD, cassette, LP | 12 | 18 | — | 1 | — | 43 | 8 | — | 2 | 4 | GER: Gold; FIN: Platinum; FRA: Gold |
| Mirrors | Released: October 1986; Label: Virgin; Format: CD, cassette, LP | 16 | — | — | 15 | — | — | 14 | — | 40 | 13 | SWI: Gold |
| Into a Secret Land | Released: 24 October 1988; Label: Virgin; Format: CD, cassette, LP | 14 | 13 | — | 10 | 14 | — | 18 | — | 22 | 9 | GER: Gold; FRA: Platinum; SWI: Platinum |
| Paintings in Yellow | Released: 26 March 1990; Label: Virgin; Format: CD, cassette, LP | 4 | 14 | — | 28 | 13 | — | — | — | 30 | 8 | GER: Gold; FRA: Gold; SWI: Platinum |
| Close to Seven | Released: February 1992; Label: Virgin; Format: CD, cassette, LP | 7 | 26 | — | — | 18 | 87 | 20 | — | 27 | 13 | |
| Fading Shades | Released: 12 June 1995; Label: Virgin; Format: CD, cassette | 42 | — | — | — | — | — | — | — | — | 37 | |
| The Wheel of Time | Released: 29 April 2002; Label: Virgin; Format: CD, cassette | 8 | 63 | 17 | — | — | — | — | — | — | 68 | |
| The Art of Love | Released: 23 February 2007; Label: Virgin; Format: CD, download | 16 | — | — | — | 159 | — | — | 26 | — | 88 | |
| Back to Life | Released: 27 March 2009; Label: Virgin; Format: CD, download | 26 | — | 47 | — | — | — | — | — | — | 83 | |
| Stay in Touch | Released: 26 October 2012; Label: Virgin; Format: CD, download | 20 | — | 40 | — | 119 | — | — | — | — | 51 | |
"—" denotes releases that did not chart

=== Compilation albums ===
| Title | Album details | Peak chart positions | | | | | | | | | | Certifications |
| Title | Album details | GER | AUT | BEL (Wa) | FIN | FRA | NLD | NOR | POL | SWE | SWI | Certifications |
|---|---|---|---|---|---|---|---|---|---|---|---|---|
| Ten on One (The Singles) | Released: October 1987; Label: Virgin; Format: CD, cassette, LP | 19 | 28 | — | — | — | — | — | — | — | 14 | GER: Gold; FRA: Gold; SWI: Platinum |
| Everlasting Love | Released: December 1988; Label: Virgin; Format: CD, cassette, LP | — | — | — | — | — | — | — | — | — | — | |
| 18 Greatest Hits | Released: 12 October 1992; Label: Virgin; Format: CD, cassette, LP | 10 | — | 5 | 1 | 4 | 81 | — | 39 | 36 | 27 | GER: Gold; FRA: Platinum; POL: Gold |
| My Favourites | Released: 4 June 1999; Label: Virgin; Format: CD, cassette | 16 | — | — | — | 16 | — | 15 | — | — | 43 | |
| Reflections | Released: 29 September 2006; Label: Virgin; Format: CD, download | 44 | — | — | — | 145 | — | — | — | — | — | |
| The Platinum Collection | Released: 6 November 2009; Label: Virgin; Format: CD, download | — | — | — | — | — | — | — | — | — | — | |
| So80s Presents Sandra | Released: 27 April 2012; Label: EMI; Format: CD, download | 50 | — | — | — | — | — | — | — | — | — | |
| The Very Best of Sandra | Released: 3 June 2016; Label: Polydor; Format: CD, download | 50 | — | — | — | — | — | — | 42 | — | — | |
"—" denotes releases that did not chart

=== Box sets ===
| Title | Details |
|---|---|
| Mirrors; Into a Secret Land | Released: 1992; Format: CD; Label: Virgin |
| The Long Play; Mirrors; Into a Secret Land | Released: 1993; Format: CD; Label: Virgin |
| The Long Play; Into a Secret Land | Released: 1995; Format: CD; Label: Virgin |
| 18 Greatest Hits; The Long Play | Released: November 2000; Format: CD; Label: Virgin |
| The Long Play; Paintings in Yellow | Released: 2011; Format: CD; Label: EMI |
| The Long Play; Mirrors; Into a Secret Land; Paintings in Yellow | Released: October 2011; Format: CD; Label: EMI |

== Singles ==
| Title | Year | Peak chart positions | | | | | | | | | | Certifications | Album |
| Title | Year | GER | AUT | BEL (Fl) | FIN | FRA | NLD | NOR | SWE | SWI | UK | Certifications | Album |
|---|---|---|---|---|---|---|---|---|---|---|---|---|---|
| "Andy mein Freund" | 1976 | — | — | — | — | — | — | — | — | — | — | | —N/a |
| "Japan ist weit" | 1984 | — | — | — | — | — | — | — | — | — | — | | —N/a |
| "(I'll Never Be) Maria Magdalena" | 1985 | 1 | 1 | 3 | 1 | 5 | 2 | 1 | 1 | 1 | 87 | GER: Gold; FRA: Silver | The Long Play |
| "In the Heat of the Night" | 1985 | 2 | 6 | 3 | 2 | 5 | 13 | — | 2 | 2 | — | FRA: Silver | The Long Play |
| "Little Girl" | 1986 | 14 | 27 | 38 | 21 | — | — | — | — | 18 | — | | The Long Play |
| "Innocent Love" | 1986 | 11 | — | — | 12 | 10 | — | 6 | — | 14 | — | | Mirrors |
| "Hi! Hi! Hi!" | 1986 | 7 | 12 | — | 7 | 13 | 47 | — | — | 20 | — | | Mirrors |
| "Loreen" | 1986 | 23 | — | — | — | — | — | — | — | 29 | — | | Mirrors |
| "Midnight Man" | 1987 | 24 | — | 34 | — | — | — | — | — | — | — | | Mirrors |
| "Everlasting Love" | 1987 | 5 | 6 | 14 | — | 12 | 12 | — | — | 5 | 45 | GER: Gold; BEL: Gold; FRA: Silver | Ten on One (The Singles) |
| "Stop for a Minute" | 1988 | 9 | — | — | — | — | — | — | — | 14 | — | | Ten on One (The Singles) |
| "Heaven Can Wait" | 1988 | 12 | 4 | — | 12 | 6 | — | — | — | 16 | 97 | FRA: Silver | Into a Secret Land |
| "Secret Land" | 1988 | 7 | 17 | — | 20 | 26 | 81 | — | 15 | 9 | — | | Into a Secret Land |
| "We'll Be Together" | 1988 | 9 | 16 | — | 15 | 13 | — | — | — | 22 | — | | Into a Secret Land |
| "Around My Heart" | 1989 | 11 | 23 | — | 27 | 28 | — | — | — | 19 | — | | Into a Secret Land |
| "Hiroshima" | 1990 | 4 | — | — | 15 | 16 | — | — | — | 4 | — | | Paintings in Yellow |
| "(Life May Be) A Big Insanity" | 1990 | 27 | — | — | — | 41 | — | — | — | — | — | | Paintings in Yellow |
| "One More Night" | 1990 | 31 | — | — | — | — | — | — | — | — | — | | Paintings in Yellow |
| "Don't Be Aggressive" | 1992 | 17 | 30 | — | 8 | 39 | 51 | 7 | 27 | 24 | 82 | | Close to Seven |
| "I Need Love" | 1992 | — | — | — | — | — | — | — | — | — | — | | Close to Seven |
| "Johnny Wanna Live" | 1992 | 37 | — | — | — | — | 67 | — | — | — | 85 | | 18 Greatest Hits |
| "Maria Magdalena" (Remix) | 1993 | — | — | — | 8 | — | — | — | — | — | 98 | | —N/a |
| "Nights in White Satin" | 1995 | 86 | — | — | 14 | — | — | — | — | — | — | | Fading Shades |
| "Won't Run Away" | 1995 | — | — | — | — | — | — | — | — | — | — | | Fading Shades |
| "Secret Land" (Remix) | 1999 | 69 | — | — | — | — | — | — | — | — | — | | My Favourites |
| "Forever" | 2001 | 47 | — | — | — | — | — | — | — | — | — | | The Wheel of Time |
| "Such a Shame" | 2002 | 76 | — | — | — | — | — | — | — | — | — | | The Wheel of Time |
| "I Close My Eyes" | 2002 | 93 | — | — | — | — | — | — | — | — | — | | The Wheel of Time |
| "Secrets of Love" (with DJ BoBo) | 2006 | 13 | 39 | — | — | — | — | — | — | 5 | — | | Greatest Hits (DJ BoBo album) |
| "The Way I Am" | 2007 | 50 | — | — | — | — | — | — | — | — | — | | The Art of Love |
| "In the Heat of the Night (2007)" | 2007 | — | — | — | — | — | — | — | — | — | — | | Reflections |
| "What Is It About Me" | 2007 | — | — | — | — | — | — | — | — | — | — | | The Art of Love |
| "In a Heartbeat" | 2009 | 59 | — | — | — | — | — | — | — | — | — | | Back to Life |
| "The Night Is Still Young" (with Thomas Anders) | 2009 | 46 | — | — | — | — | — | — | — | — | — | | Back to Life |
| "Maybe Tonight" | 2012 | 77 | — | — | — | — | — | — | — | — | — | | Stay in Touch |
| "Infinite Kiss" | 2012 | — | — | — | — | — | — | — | — | — | — | | Stay in Touch |
| "In the Heat of the Night" (Remix) | 2016 | — | — | — | — | — | — | — | — | — | — | | The Very Best of Sandra |
"—" denotes releases that did not chart

=== Promotional singles ===
| Title | Year | Footnotes | Album |
|---|---|---|---|
| "Sisters and Brothers" | 1988 | Released only in Japan. | The Long Play |
| "La vista de luna" | 1989 | Released only in Spain. | Into a Secret Land |
| "Steady Me" | 1992 | Released only in Germany. | Close to Seven |
| "Seal It Forever" | 1992 | Radio single; released only in Brazil. | Close to Seven |
| "In the Heat of the Night" | 1999 | Released only in France. | My Favourites |
| "Maria Magdalena" | 1999 | Released only in France. | My Favourites |
| "Forgive Me" | 2002 | Released only in Germany. | The Wheel of Time |
| "Everlasting Love (2006)" | 2006 | Radio single; released only in Germany. | Reflections |
| "Around My Heart (2006)" | 2006 | Radio single; released only in Poland. | Reflections |
| "All You Zombies" | 2007 | Radio single; released only in Poland. | The Art of Love |

== Videography ==
=== Video albums ===
| Title | Details | GER | Certifications |
|---|---|---|---|
| Ten on One (The Singles) | Released: 1987; Format: VHS; Label: Virgin | — | GER: Gold |
| 18 Greatest Hits | Released: 1992; Format: VHS; Label: Virgin | — | |
| The Complete History | Released: 2003; Format: DVD; Label: Virgin | 94 | GER: Gold |
"—" denotes releases that did not chart

=== Music videos ===
| Year | Title | Director |
|---|---|---|
| 1985 | "(I'll Never Be) Maria Magdalena" | Mike Leckebusch |
| 1985 | "In the Heat of the Night" | Michael Bentele |
| 1986 | "Little Girl" | Mike Stiebel |
| 1986 | "Innocent Love" | DoRo (Rudi Dolezal and Hannes Rossacher) |
| 1986 | "Hi! Hi! Hi!" | DoRo (Rudi Dolezal and Hannes Rossacher) |
| 1986 | "Loreen" | Kai von Kotze |
| 1987 | "Midnight Man" | Wolfgang Simon and Michael von Almsick |
| 1987 | "Everlasting Love" | DoRo |
| 1988 | "Stop for a Minute" | DoRo |
| 1988 | "Heaven Can Wait" | DoRo |
| 1988 | "Secret Land" | Bulle Bernd |
| 1988 | "We'll Be Together" | Bulle Bernd |
| 1989 | "Around My Heart" | Bulle Bernd |
| 1990 | "Hiroshima" | Roland Willaert |
| 1990 | "(Life May Be) A Big Insanity" | Howard Greenhalgh |
| 1990 | "One More Night" | Dieter Trattmann |
| 1992 | "Don't Be Aggressive" | Howard Greenhalgh |
| 1992 | "I Need Love" | Howard Greenhalgh |
| 1992 | "Johnny Wanna Live" | Howard Greenhalgh |
| 1993 | "Maria Magdalena Remix '93" | Marcus Adams |
| 1995 | "Nights in White Satin" | Angel Hart |
| 1999 | "Secret Land Remix '99" | Thomas Job |
| 2001 | "Forever" | Thomas Job |
| 2006 | "Secrets of Love" | Robert Bröllochs |
| 2009 | "The Night Is Still Young" | Susanne Sigi |
| 2012 | "Infinite Kiss" | Jens Gad and Susanne Sigi |

== Background vocals ==
Aside from the radio edit version of Andru Donalds' "Precious Little Diamond" (2000), Sandra has participated on 18 different songs for Enigma:

| Year | Album | Songs |
|---|---|---|
| 1990 | MCMXC a.D. | "Sadeness"; "Find Love"; "Callas Went Away"; "Mea Culpa (Part II)" |
| 1993 | The Cross of Changes | "Second Chapter"; "The Eyes of Truth"; "Return to Innocence"; "I Love You... I'll Kill You"; "Age of Loneliness (Carly's Song)" |
| 1996 | Le Roi est mort, vive le Roi! | "Beyond the Invisible"; "T.N.T. for the Brain" |
| 1999 | The Screen Behind the Mirror | "Smell of Desire"; "The Screen Behind the Mirror"; "Between Mind and Heart" |
| 2001 | Love Sensuality Devotion: The Greatest Hits | "Turn Around" |
| 2003 | Voyageur | "Voyageur"; "Page of Cups"; "Look of Today" |
