= The Platinum Collection (Sandra album) =

Compilation album by Sandra
- Released: 6 November 2009
- Recorded: 1985–2009
- Genre: Synth-pop
- Label: Virgin
- Producer: Michael Cretu, Jens Gad, Armand Volker

Sandra chronology
Back to Life (2009)	The Platinum Collection (2009)	Stay in Touch (2012)

The Platinum Collection is a compilation album by German singer Sandra released in 2009 by Virgin Records.

== Overview ==
The Platinum Collection is one of Sandra's most comprehensive compilations to date, including all of her single songs released between 1985 and 2009 as well as some album tracks, remastered and arranged chronologically. Many of the songs are presented in shorter single edits. Two versions of the album were released: a 2-CD version and a 3-CD set, the latter including a selection of extended mixes originally available on 12" maxi singles. CD 3 also enables buyers to download 5 additional extended mixes in MP3 format and 5 high-quality photos and biography in English and German in PDF format (with the same content as the booklet in physical releases). A total of 23 exclusive tracks are included in this release: 12 previously unreleased on CD, 10 that were previously available on CD single only (or other formats such 12" single at the time of its original release; now out-of-print), and 1 that was previously available for promotional use only.

== Track listing ==
CD 1 (1985–1992)

1. "Maria Magdalena" (Single Version) – 3:56
2. "In the Heat of Night" (Single Version) – 4:00 †
3. "Little Girl" – 3:08
4. "Sisters and Brothers" – 3:21
5. "Innocent Love" (Single Version) – 3:48 †
6. "Hi! Hi! Hi!" (Single Version) – 3:30 †
7. "Loreen" – 4:11
8. "Midnight Man" (Single Version) – 3:02
9. "Everlasting Love" – 3:41
10. "Stop for a Minute" (Single Version) – 3:48 †
11. "Heaven Can Wait" (Single Version) – 4:04
12. "Secret Land" (Single Version) – 4:01
13. "Celebrate Your Life" – 3:25
14. "We'll Be Together" (Single Remix) – 3:46
15. "Around My Heart" (Single Version) – 3:08
16. "Hiroshima" (Single Version) – 4:14
17. "(Life May Be) A Big Insanity" – 4:28
18. "One More Night" (Single Version) – 3:40
19. "Lovelight in Your Eyes" – 5:26
20. "Johnny Wanna Live" (Single Remix) – 3:47

CD 2 (1992–2009)

1. "Don't Be Aggressive" (Radio Edit) – 4:22
2. "I Need Love" (Radio Edit) – 3:18
3. "Steady Me" – 3:54
4. "Mirrored in Your Eyes" – 3:23
5. "Maria Magdalena '93" – 4:02 ††
6. "Nights in White Satin" (Radio Edit) – 3:32
7. "Won't Run Away" – 4:11 ††
8. "Secret Land '99" (Ultra Violet Radio Edit) – 3:40 ††
9. "Forever" – 3:44
10. "Such a Shame" – 4:16
11. "Forgive Me" (Radio Edit) – 3:57 ††
12. "I Close My Eyes" – 4:01
13. "Secrets of Love" (Duet with DJ BoBo) – 3:17
14. "The Way I Am" – 3:28
15. "What Is It About Me" (Radio Edit) – 3:09
16. "All You Zombies" – 4:59
17. "In a Heartbeat" – 3:36
18. "The Night Is Still Young" (feat. Thomas Anders) – 3:19
19. "What If" – 2:48
20. "Tête à Tête" – 3:44

CD 3 (The Best 12" Versions)

1. "Maria Magdalena" (Extended Version) – 7:07 †
2. "In the Heat of the Night" (Extended Version) – 7:20 †
3. "Little Girl" (Extended Version) – 5:17 †
4. "Innocent Love" (Extended Version) – 6:42 †
5. "Hi! Hi! Hi!" (Extended Version) – 6:09 †
6. "Midnight Man" (Extended Version) – 5:25 †
7. "Everlasting Love" (Extended Version) – 7:16 †
8. "Stop for a Minute" (Extended Version) – 6:17 †
9. "Heaven Can Wait" (Extended Version) – 7:36 ††
10. "Secret Land" (Reverse Mix) – 6:30 ††
11. "Everlasting Love" (PWL 12" Remix) – 7:41 ††

CD 3 digital bonus content

1. "We'll Be Together" (Extended Version) – 6:37 ††
2. "Hiroshima" (Extended Version) – 6:44
3. "Don't Be Aggressive" (The Midnight Hour Mix) – 6:22 ††
4. "Nights in White Satin" (Club Mix) – 6:07 ††
5. "Secret Land '99" (Ultra Violet Club Mix) – 5:34 ††

† Previously unreleased on CD.
†† Previously available on CD single only.

== Charts ==
Chart performance for Reflections
Chart (2016)	Peak position
Polish Albums (ZPAV)	18
