= Everlasting Love (Sandra album) =

Compilation album by Sandra
- Released: 1988
- Recorded: 1985–1988
- Genre: Pop
- Length: 37:25
- Label: Virgin
- Producers: Michael Cretu, Armand Volker, Pete Hammond

Sandra chronology
Into a Secret Land (1988)	Everlasting Love (1988)	Paintings in Yellow (1990)

Professional ratings
Review scores
Source	Rating
AllMusic	4.5/5 stars

Everlasting Love is a compilation album by German singer Sandra, released in 1988 by Virgin Records.

== Overview ==
The album was released in late 1988 only in the UK, North America and Australia. It consists of most singles from Sandra's first three studio albums plus "Everlasting Love", the latter remixed to match the taste of the Anglo-American audience. The PWL version of "Everlasting Love" was released to promote the compilation and was a minor chart hit in the UK, although the album itself was not a commercial success.

== Track listing ==
1. "Everlasting Love" (Buzz Cason, Mac Gayden) — 3:57
2. "Maria Magdalena" (Hubert Kemmler, Markus Löhr, Michael Cretu, Richard Palmer-James) — 3:57
3. "Secret Land" (Uwe Gronau, Hubert Kemmler, Michael Cretu, Mats Björklund, Susanne Müller-Pi, Klaus Hirschburger, Michael Höing) — 4:41
4. "Heaven Can Wait" (Michael Cretu, Hubert Kemmler, Markus Löhr, Klaus Hirschburger) — 4:02
5. "Hi Hi Hi" (Michael Cretu, Hubert Kemmler, Klaus Hirschburger) — 4:09
6. "We'll Be Together" (Hubert Kemmler, Markus Löhr, Sandra Cretu, Klaus Hirschburger) — 4:08
7. "In the Heat of the Night" (Michael Cretu, Hubert Kemmler, Marcus Löhr, Klaus Hirschburger) — 5:18
8. "Around My Heart" (Hubert Kemmler, Markus Löhr, Sör Otto's, Frank Peterson, Klaus Hirschburger) — 3:17
9. "Little Girl" (Hubert Kemmler, Marcus Löhr, Michael Cretu) — 3:10
10. "Loreen" (Frank Peterson, Michael Cretu, Klaus Hirschburger) — 4:11
