= My Favourites =

1999 greatest hits by Sandra

Greatest hits album by Sandra
- Released: 4 June 1999
- Recorded: 1985–1999
- Genre: Pop
- Length: 1:35:20
- Label: Virgin
- Producers: Michael Cretu; Jens Gad

Sandra chronology
Fading Shades (1995)	My Favourites (1999)	The Wheel of Time (2002)

Professional ratings
Review scores
Source	Rating
AllMusic	3.5/5 stars

My Favourites is the third greatest hits album by German singer Sandra, released on 4 June 1999 by Virgin Records.

== Background ==
My Favourites is a double album consisting of some of Sandra's hits and non-single tracks newly remixed by long-time band companion Peter Ries and Wolfgang Filz on disc 1, and some of Sandra's favourite songs from her repertoire, mostly ballads, on disc 2. The compilation includes eight tracks from Close to Seven, six from Fading Shades, five from Into a Secret Land, two from The Long Play and Paintings in Yellow, and one from 18 Greatest Hits. The concept of the album followed a trend established by such artists as Modern Talking and Amanda Lear who had recently remixed and re-recorded old material on their respective albums Back for Good and Back in Your Arms.

The new version of "Secret Land" was released as the only regular single from the album and was a minor chart hit in Germany. "Maria Magdalena" and "In the Heat of the Night" were released as promotional vinyl singles only in France. "No Taboo" was planned to be the next single, but the release was eventually cancelled. My Favourites was a top 20 chart success in Germany and Norway.

== Track listing ==
Disc one (Remixes)

1. "Mirrored in Your Eyes" (Michael Cretu, Peter Cornelius) – 3:36
2. "Secret Land" (Uwe Gronau, Hubert Kemmler, Michael Cretu, Mats Björklund, Susanne Müller-Pi, Klaus Hirschburger, Michael Höing) – 3:19
3. "We'll Be Together" (Hubert Kemmler, Markus Löhr, Sandra Cretu, Klaus Hirschburger) – 3:53
4. "Won't Run Away" (Jens Gad, Klaus Hirschburger) – 4:08
5. "Maria Magdalena" (Hubert Kemmler, Markus Löhr, Michael Cretu, Richard Palmer-James) – 3:59
6. "Heaven Can Wait" (Michael Cretu, Hubert Kemmler, Markus Löhr, Klaus Hirschburger) – 4:10
7. "Hiroshima" (David Morgan) – 4:25
8. "Tell Me More" (Jens Gad, Klaus Hirschburger) – 3:38
9. "Celebrate Your Life" (Hubert Kemmler, Klaus Hirschburger) – 3:38
10. "Around My Heart" (Hubert Kemmler, Markus Löhr, Sör Otto's, Frank Peterson, Klaus Hirschburger) – 3:42
11. "In the Heat of the Night" (Michael Cretu, Hubert Kemmler, Markus Löhr, Klaus Hirschburger) – 4:28
12. "Way to India" (Michael Cretu, Klaus Hirschburger) – 4:51

Disc two (Originals)

1. "No Taboo" (Michael Cretu, David Fairstein) – 3:51
2. "Johnny Wanna Live" (Michael Cretu, Frank Peterson, Klaus Hirschburger) – 3:45
3. "Don't Be Aggressive" (Michael Cretu, Klaus Hirschburger) – 4:46
4. "One More Night" (Michael Cretu, Frank Peterson, Klaus Hirschburger) – 3:39
5. "Steady Me" (Michael Cretu, Peter Cornelius, Klaus Hirschburger) – 3:57
6. "Love Turns to Pain" (Michael Cretu, Klaus Hirschburger) – 4:59
7. "Seal It Forever" (Michael Cretu, Klaus Hirschburger) – 4:50
8. "I Need Love '95" (Michael Cretu, Klaus Hirschburger) – 3:27
9. "When the Rain Doesn't Come" (Michael Cretu, Sandra Cretu) – 4:44
10. "Nights in White Satin" (Justin Hayward) – 3:35
11. "First Lullaby" (Michael Cretu, Jens Gad, Klaus Hirschburger) – 4:30
12. "Fading Shades" (Jens Gad) – 0:53

== Charts ==
Chart performance for My Favourites
Chart (1999)	Peak position
European Albums (Music & Media)	69
German Albums (Offizielle Top 100)	16
Norwegian Albums (VG-lista)	15
Swiss Albums (Schweizer Hitparade)	43
