= Reflections (Sandra album) =

Remix album by Sandra
- Released: 29 September 2006
- Recorded: 1985–1990, 2006
- Genre: Pop, dance
- Length: 46:13 (original release); 56:17 (special edition)
- Label: Virgin
- Producer: Jens Gad

Sandra chronology
The Wheel of Time (2002)	Reflections (2006)	The Art of Love (2007)

Reflections is a remix album by German singer Sandra, released in 2006 by Virgin Records.

== Background ==
The album consists of remixes of hits from Sandra's first four studio albums, released between 1985 and 1990. Virgin Records suggested that vocal recordings of Sandra's biggest hits be sent to different teams of producers/remixers so that they could create entirely new music. Sandra hesitated at first because she had already put out a remix collection My Favourites in 1999 and had already finished her eighth studio album The Art of Love, wishing to move forward in a new musical direction. The new remixes were produced by Christian Geller, Schallbau, Felix J. Gauder, Matthias Menck, Ivo Moring and Mirko von Schlieffen. Sandra also recorded new vocals to her 1987 dance hit "Everlasting Love" which was rearranged as a ballad and distributed to radio stations in Germany as a promotional single. The new remix of "Around My Heart" was in turn released to radio stations in Poland where it went on to becoming a top 5 airplay hit.

In 2007, Virgin Music France released a special edition of Reflections, with the subtitle The Reproduced Hits, containing three new remixes made by French DJs: "In the Heat of the Night" remixed by Future Vision and Superfunk, and "(I'll Never Be) Maria Magdalena" by Junior Caldera. "In the Heat of the Night 2007" was released online as a digital single in March 2007.

== Track listings ==
=== Original release ===
No.	Title	Writer(s)	Remixer(s)	Length
1.	"Around My Heart (2006)"	Hubert Kemmler; Markus Löhr; Sör Otto's; Frank Peterson; Klaus Hirschburger	Felix J. Gauder	3:23
2.	"Stop for a Minute (2006)"	Michael Cretu; Hirschburger	Christian Geller	3:45
3.	"Hi! Hi! Hi! (2006)"	Cretu; Kemmler; Hirschburger	Geller	4:17
4.	"Maria Magdalena (2006)"	Kemmler; Löhr; Cretu; Richard Palmer-James	Schallbau	3:57
5.	"In the Heat of the Night (2006)"	Cretu; Kemmler; Löhr; Hirschburger	Gauder	3:37
6.	"Heaven Can Wait (2006)"	Cretu; Kemmler; Löhr; Hirschburger	Geller	3:24
7.	"Everlasting Love (2006)"	Buzz Cason; Mac Gayden	Geller	3:46
8.	"Hiroshima (2006)"	Dave Morgan	Schallbau	4:17
9.	"One More Night (2006)"	Cretu; Peterson; Hirschburger	Schallbau	4:08
10.	"Secret Land (2006)"	Uwe Gronau; Kemmler; Cretu; Mats Björklund; Susanne Müller-Pi; Hirschburger; Michael Höing	Geller	4:06
11.	"Innocent Love (2006)"	Kemmler; Ulrich Herter; Müller-Pi; Hirschburger	Ivo Moring; Mirko von Schlieffen	3:46
12.	"We'll Be Together (2006)"	Kemmler; Löhr; Sandra Cretu; Hirschburger	Matthias Menck	3:46

=== Special edition ===
No.	Title	Writer(s)	Remixer(s)	Length
1.	"In the Heat of the Night" (Future Vision Remix Radio Edit)	Michael Cretu; Hubert Kemmler; Markus Löhr; Klaus Hirschburger	Future Vision	3:16
2.	"Maria Magdalena" (Junior Caldera Remix Radio Edit)	Kemmler; Löhr; Cretu; Richard Palmer-James	Junior Caldera	3:02
3.	"Around My Heart (2006)"	Kemmler; Löhr; Sör Otto's; Frank Peterson; Hirschburger	Felix J. Gauder	3:23
4.	"Stop for a Minute (2006)"	Cretu; Hirschburger	Christian Geller	3:45
5.	"Hi! Hi! Hi! (2006)"	Cretu; Kemmler; Hirschburger	Geller	4:17
6.	"Maria Magdalena (2006)"	Kemmler; Löhr; Cretu; Palmer-James	Schallbau	3:57
7.	"In the Heat of the Night (2006)"	Cretu; Kemmler; Löhr; Hirschburger	Gauder	3:37
8.	"Heaven Can Wait (2006)"	Cretu; Kemmler; Löhr; Hirschburger	Geller	3:24
9.	"Everlasting Love (2006)"	Buzz Cason; Mac Gayden	Geller	3:46
10.	"Hiroshima (2006)"	Dave Morgan	Schallbau	4:17
11.	"One More Night (2006)"	Cretu; Peterson; Hirschburger	Schallbau	4:08
12.	"Secret Land (2006)"	Uwe Gronau; Kemmler; Cretu; Mats Björklund; Susanne Müller-Pi; Hirschburger; Michael Höing	Geller	4:06
13.	"Innocent Love (2006)"	Kemmler; Ulrich Herter; Müller-Pi; Hirschburger	Ivo Moring; Mirko von Schlieffen	3:46
14.	"We'll Be Together (2006)"	Kemmler; Löhr; Sandra Cretu; Hirschburger	Matthias Menck	3:46
15.	"In the Heat of the Night" (Superfunk Remix Radio Edit)	Cretu; Kemmler; Löhr; Hirschburger	Superfunk	3:47

== Charts ==
Chart performance for Reflections
Chart (2006–2007)	Peak position
French Albums (SNEP)	145
German Albums (Offizielle Top 100)	44
