= I Close My Eyes =

Single by Sandra

from the album The Wheel of Time
- Released: 11 November 2002
- Genre: Pop
- Length: 4:08
- Label: Virgin
- Songwriter(s): Andy Jonas
- Producer(s): Michael Cretu, Jens Gad

Sandra singles chronology
"Such a Shame" (2002)	"I Close My Eyes" (2002)	"Secrets of Love" (2006)

Licensed audio
- "I Close My Eyes" on YouTube

"I Close My Eyes" is a 2002 pop ballad by German singer Sandra. It was released on 11 November 2002 by Virgin Records as the third and final single from her seventh studio album The Wheel of Time. The song was written by Andy Jonas (also known as Angel Hard) who has performed male vocals on her fifth and sixth studio albums, and produced by Michael Cretu and Jens Gad. The song performed poorly on the charts and peaked only at number ninety-three in Germany.

== Track listing ==
- CD maxi single
1. "I Close My Eyes" — 4:08
2. "Forgive Me" (Chill Out Radio Edit) — 4:18
3. "The Wheel of Time" — 4:09
4. "Forever" (Video) — 3:44

== Charts ==
Chart (2002)	Peak position
Germany (Official German Charts)	93
