= Military Drums (song) =

Single by Hubert Kah
- Released: May 1987
- Length: 3:38
- Label: Curb; RCA; Blow Up
- Songwriter(s): Michael Cretu; Susanne Müller-Pi
- Producer(s): Michael Cretu; Armand Volker

Hubert Kah singles chronology
"Love Is So Sensible" (1986)	"Military Drums" (1987)	"Welcome, Machine Gun" (1989)

"Military Drums" is a song by German synthpop band Hubert Kah, released in 1987 as a non-album single. The song was written by Michael Cretu (music) and Susanne Müller-Pi (lyrics), and produced by Cretu and Armand Volker.

In 1987, "Military Drums" was added as the opening track on a "special edition" Germany-only reissue of the band's 1986 album Tensongs. The song was also included on the US and Japanese editions of the band's 1989 album Sound of My Heart. In 2005, Hubert Kemmler re-recorded the song for the sixth Hubert Kah album, Seelentaucher.

== Background ==
Speaking of the song, Hirschburger recalled to James Arena in 2017: "[It was written] in about 10 minutes in Ibiza feeling very jet lagged. We added trumpets, recorded it in about five hours and launched it as a single." The song features Carol Kenyon on backing vocals.

"Military Drums" was the band's first single to enter the US Billboard Hot Dance Music Club Play chart, peaking at No. 8 in November 1987. It was also the band's last Top 40 hit in Germany, reaching No. 35.

== Promotion ==
The song's music video was directed by Rudi Dolezal and Hannes Rossacher of DoRo Productions. On its release, Rossacher described the video as "slightly avant-garde". The video makes the use of speed manipulation which was achieved by shooting the video on six frames per second. On German TV, the band performed the song on ZDF-Hitparade on 20 August 1987.

== Critical reception ==
Upon its release, Billboard described the song as a "Euro-influenced techno number".

== Track listing ==
7" single

1. "Military Drums" - 3:41
2. "Explain the World in a Word" - 4:11

12" single (European release)

1. "Military Drums" (Extended Version) - 6:27
2. "Explain the World in a Word" - 4:11

12" single (US release)

1. "Military Drums" (Extended Version) - 6:27
2. "Military Drums" - 3:41
3. "Explain the World in a Word" - 4:11

12" single (US promo)

1. "Military Drums" (Extended Version) - 6:27
2. "Military Drums" (Edited Version) - 3:14
3. "Military Drums" - 3:41

12" single (US promo #2)

1. "Military Drums" (Crossover Radio Edit) - 3:50
2. "Military Drums" (Powermix) - 5:20
3. "Military Drums" (LP Edit Version) - 3:14
4. "Military Drums" (Dance Edit By Ali Lexa) - 6:50

CD single (German release)

1. "Military Drums" (Extended Version) - 6:27
2. "Explain the World in a Word" - 4:11
3. "Military Drums" (7" Version) - 3:41

CD single (German release #2)

1. "Military Drums" (Extended Version) - 6:27
2. "Explain the World in a Word" - 4:11
3. "Limousine" (Extended Version) - 5:40
4. "Something I Should Know" (Remix Version) - 3:27
5. "Military Drums" (Video Version) - 6:27 3:38

Expanded" single (Worldwide promo)

1. "Militarty Drums" (Edit) - 3:39
2. "Military Drums" (7" Version) - 3:41
3. "Military Drums" (Edited Version) - 3:14
4. "Military Drums" (Crossover Radio Edit) - 3:50
5. "Military Drums" (Maxi Version) - 5:00
6. "Military Drums" (Extended Version) - 5:40
7. "Military Drums" (Powermix) - 5:20
8. "Military Drums" (Dance Edit By Ali Lexa) - 6:50
9. "Explain the World in a Word" - 4:11

The Maxi Version Of Military Drums Is An Edit Track Of The "Extended Version"

== Personnel ==
Hubert Kah

- Hubert Kemmler – vocals
- Markus Löhr – guitar, keyboards
- Klaus Hirschburger – bass
- Carol Kenyon – backing vocals

Production

- Michael Cretu, Armand Volker – producers
- Boris Granich, Christer Modig – remixers on "Crossover Radio Edit" and "Powermix"
- Ali Lexa - remixer on "Dance Edit By Ali Lexa"

Other

- Mike Schmidt at Ink Studios – cover
- Dieter Eikelpoth – photography

== Charts ==
Chart (1987)	Peak position
German Singles Chart	35
US Billboard Hot Dance Music Club Play	8
US Billboard Hot Dance Music 12-inch Singles Sales	33
