= We'll Be Together =

We'll Be Together may refer to:

- "We'll Be Together" (Sting song)
- "We'll Be Together" (Sandra song)
- "We'll Be Together", a song by singer/actor Elvis Presley from his 1962 musical film Girls! Girls! Girls!
- "We'll Be Together", a song by singer/actress Ashley Tisdale on her solo album, Headstrong
- "We'll Be Together", a song from the 1982 musical film Grease 2

== See also ==
- "Someday We'll Be Together", a 1961 R&B/soul song, notably covered by Diana Ross & the Supremes in 1969
