= The Energy of Sound =

Studio album by Trance Atlantic Air Waves
- Released: July 14, 1998
- Recorded: A.R.T. Studios, Ibiza
- Genre: Electronica
- Length: 45:55
- Label: Virgin
- Producers: Michael Cretu, Jens Gad

Professional ratings
Review scores
Source	Rating
Allmusic	(2.5/5)

The Energy of Sound is a 1998 album created by Trance Atlantic Air Waves, a side project of Michael Cretu. Cretu worked alongside Jens Gad during the recording of the album. Out of the ten songs in the album, only three were original as the rest were all cover versions.

== Track listing ==
No.	Title	Written by	Length
1.	"Lucifer"	Alan Parsons, Eric Norman Woolfson	3:53
2.	"Axel F."	Harold Faltermeyer	3:52
3.	"Crockett's Theme"	Jan Hammer	3:45
4.	"Dance with the Devil"	M. Hayes, P. Dennys	3:53
5.	"Addiction Day"	Jens Gad	4:56
6.	"Magic Fly (Wonderland Mix)"	Ecama	6:17
7.	"Chase"	Giorgio Moroder	3:37
8.	"Twelve After Midnight"	Jens Gad	5:02
9.	"L-42"	Jens Gad, Michael Cretu	4:31
10.	"Pulstar"	Evangelos Papathanassiou	6:09

== Singles ==
- 1997 – "Magic Fly"
- 1998 – "Chase"
- 1998 – "Crockett's Theme"

== See also ==
- Enigma (musical project)
- Sandra (singer)
