= Stay in Touch =

Studio album by Sandra
- Released: 26 October 2012
- Recorded: 2011–2012
- Genre: Synth-pop
- Length: 54:44
- Label: Virgin
- Producer: Blank & Jones

Sandra chronology
The Platinum Collection (2009)	Stay in Touch (2012)	The Very Best of Sandra (2016)

Singles from Stay in Touch
- 1. "Maybe Tonight" Released: 11 May 2012; 2. "Infinite Kiss" Released: 23 October 2012

Professional ratings
Review scores
Source	Rating
Cantara Music	Positive
laut.de	1/5 stars
Onet.pl	Positive

Stay in Touch is the tenth studio album by German singer Sandra, released on 26 October 2012 by Virgin Records. It is her last studio album to date.

== Background ==
The album was produced by a German DJ duo Blank & Jones and most of the songs were written or co-written by Jens Gad. The material incorporated 1980s style into songs, reproducing the sound pattern of Sandra's early albums, with the track "Kings & Queens" sampling her 1985 song "(I'll Never Be) Maria Magdalena". It was also the first album since 1988's Into a Secret Land to feature Hubert Kemmler as a songwriter and background vocalist.

"Maybe Tonight" was released as the first single in May 2012 and charted at number 77 in Germany. The second and final single was "Infinite Kiss", accompanied by a music video filmed largely at a concert in Warsaw, Poland in September 2012. Sandra's look in the video was partly inspired by the novel Fifty Shades of Grey which the singer admitted she is a fan of. The music video premiered on 23 October 2012. "Infinite Kiss" was released as a digital maxi single in November 2012 and failed to chart. It included an exclusive track "Russian Eyes", otherwise available solely on Russian and Ukrainian editions of the album.

Stay in Touch was released on 26 October 2012 in both standard format and a double-disc deluxe edition featuring extended versions of songs. The album reached the top 20 in Sandra's native Germany and the top 40 in the Czech Republic.

== Track listing ==
All tracks are written by Jens Gad (except where noted) and produced by Blank & Jones.

Standard edition
No.	Title	Writer(s)	Length
1.	"Stay in Touch"	Gad; Hubert Kemmler	3:48
2.	"Infinite Kiss"	Gad; Kemmler	2:51
3.	"Between Me & the Moon"		3:22
4.	"Maybe Tonight"		3:05
5.	"Moscow Nights"		3:41
6.	"Heart of Wax"		4:15
7.	"Kings & Queens"		3:16
8.	"Angels in My Head"		2:55
9.	"Sand Heart"		3:47
10.	"Love Starts with a Smile"		3:26
11.	"Sun in Disguise"	Susanne Sigl; Kemmler	4:23

Russian and Ukrainian edition bonus track
No.	Title	Writer(s)	Length
12.	"Russian Eyes"	Gad; Kemmler	3:44

Deluxe edition bonus disc
No.	Title	Writer(s)	Length
1.	"Moscow Nights" (Extended Version)		5:12
2.	"Kings & Queens" (Extended Version)		6:30
3.	"Love Starts with a Smile" (Extended Version)		5:46
4.	"Angels in My Head" (Extended Version)		5:35
5.	"Stay in Touch" (Extended Version)	Gad; Kemmler	5:48
6.	"Between Me & the Moon" (Extended Version)		5:27
7.	"Sun in Disguise" (Extended Version)	Sigl; Kemmler	5:57
8.	"Maybe Tonight" (Extended Version)		4:58
9.	"Infinite Kiss" (Extended Version)	Gad; Kemmler	5:17
10.	"Sand Heart" (Extended Version)		6:20
11.	"Heart of Wax" (Extended Version)		7:12

iTunes Store edition bonus track
No.	Title	Writer(s)	Length
12.	"Infinite Kiss" (Ibiza Club Mix)	Gad; Kemmler	6:44

== Charts ==
Chart performance for Stay in Touch
Chart (2012)	Peak position
Belgian Albums (Ultratop Wallonia)	174
Czech Albums (ČNS IFPI)	40
French Albums (SNEP)	119
German Albums (Offizielle Top 100)	20
Swiss Albums (Schweizer Hitparade)	51
