= Everlasting Love (disambiguation) =

"Everlasting Love" is a 1967 single by Robert Knight, later covered by other artists, notably Love Affair and Carl Carlton.

Everlasting Love may also refer to:

== Music ==
=== Albums ===
- Everlasting Love (Vanessa Williams album), 2005
- Everlasting Love (Sandra album), 1988
- Everlasting Love (CeCe Winans album), 1998

=== Songs ===
- "Everlasting Love", a song performed by Rufus featuring Chaka Khan, on their 1977 album Ask Rufus, later covered by Mary J. Blige in 1995
- "Everlasting Love" (Howard Jones song), 1989
- "An Everlasting Love", a 1978 single by Andy Gibb
- "This Will Be (An Everlasting Love)", a 1975 single by Natalie Cole
- "Everlasting Love", a song by Stephanie Mills from the 1984 album I've Got the Cure
- "Everlasting Love", a song by Robin Zander from the 1993 album Robin Zander
- "Everlasting Love", a song by Dutch singer, Gerard Joling from the 1994 album Eternal Love
- "Everlasting Love", a song by Fifth Harmony from Reflection

== Other ==
- Everlasting Love (film), a 1984 film by Michael Mak
- "An Everlasting Love" (Medium), a 2010 episode
