= Stop for a Minute (Sandra song) =

Single by Sandra

from the album Ten on One (The Singles)
- B-side: "Two Lovers Tonight"
- Released: January 1988
- Genre: Europop
- Length: 4:05 (Single Version) 6:17 (Extended Version)
- Label: Virgin
- Songwriters: Michael Cretu, Klaus Hirschburger
- Producer: Michael Cretu

Sandra singles chronology
"Everlasting Love" (1987)	"Stop for a Minute" (1988)	"Heaven Can Wait" (1988)

Licensed audio
- "Stop For A Minute" on YouTube

"Stop for a Minute" is a 1987 pop song by German singer Sandra, written by Michael Cretu and Klaus Hirschburger, and produced by Cretu. It was released as the second single from Sandra's first greatest hits compilation Ten on One (The Singles) in early 1988, and reached the top 10 on the German sales and airplay charts. The song was used in the German crime TV series Tatort, in the episode "Salü Palu", where Sandra performs it in a club scene. The show was set in Saarbrücken, Sandra's hometown, and aired on 24 January 1988.

The music video for the song was directed by DoRo (Rudi Dolezal and Hannes Rossacher) and largely uses footage from Sandra's appearance in Tatort. The clip was released on Sandra's VHS video compilations Ten on One (The Singles) and 18 Greatest Hits, released in 1987 and 1992, respectively, as well as the 2003 DVD The Complete History.

A new remix of the song was included on Sandra's 2006 retrospective Reflections.

== Formats and track listings ==
- 7" single

A. "Stop for a Minute" – 4:05
B. "Two Lovers Tonight" – 3:45

- 12" single

A "Stop for a Minute" (Extended Version) – 6:19
B1. "Two Lovers Tonight" – 3:45
B2. "Stop for a Minute" (Single Version) – 4:05

== Charts ==
Chart (1988)	Peak position
Denmark (IFPI)	15
Europe (European Hot 100 Singles)	38
Germany (Official German Charts)	9
Switzerland (Schweizer Hitparade)	14
