= Sound of My Heart =

Studio album by Hubert Kah
- Released: 1 January 1989
- Genre: Synthpop
- Label: RCA, Blow Up, CBS, Curb
- Producer: Michael Cretu

Hubert Kah chronology
Tensongs (1986)	Sound of My Heart (1989)	Hubert Kah (1996)

Sound of My Heart is the fifth studio album by the German synthpop band Hubert Kah, and their second English language album, released in 1989. It was produced by Michael Cretu. Three singles were released from the album: "Welcome, Machine Gun", "So Many People" and "It's Me, Cathy (Follow My Heart)". The band's 1987 single "Military Drums" was also included as a track on the Japanese and US editions of Sound of My Heart.

== Reception ==
Professional ratings
Review scores
Source	Rating
AllMusic	3/5 stars

Upon release, Billboard commented: "Early dance hit "Machine Gun" and current "So Many People" prove to be a somewhat deceptive introduction to a collection that fits more comfortably in a techno/modern rock bag. Although pop radio at large may miss the boat on this one, tracks like "Cathy" and "Carousel" may appeal to the more adventurous programmers". Barry Walters of The San Francisco Examiner noted Kemmler's "soaring, stylish tenor" and Cretu's "lavish, invigorating production" on the album.

== Track listing ==
No.	Title	Writer(s)	Length
1.	"Welcome, Machine Gun"	Hubert Kemmler, Klaus Hirschburger	3:31
2.	"Carrousel"	Kemmler, Markus Löhr, Hirschburger	4:15
3.	"Cathy"	Kemmler, Löhr, Hirschburger	3:50
4.	"Midnight Sun"	Kemmler, Hirschburger	4:23
5.	"Sound of My Heart"	Kemmler, Löhr, Hirschburger, Susanne Müller	4:15
6.	"So Many People"	Kemmler, Löhr, Michael Cretu, Hirschburger	4:41
7.	"Help Me Through the Night (When Devil Comes)"	Kemmler, Löhr, Hirschburger	4:47
8.	"The Voice of Silence"	Kemmler, Löhr, Hirschburger, Müller	4:49
9.	"Victim of Brain"	Gerhard Würzberg, Roland Zinne, Harald Messmer, Müller, Kemmler	4:01

1989 Japanese CD (original track 9 is track 10)
No.	Title	Writer(s)	Length
9.	"Military Drums"	Cretu, Müller	3:39

== Chart performance ==
=== Album ===
Chart (1989)	Peak position
German Albums Chart	40

=== Singles ===
Military Drums

Chart (1987)	Peak position
German Singles Chart	35
U.S. Billboard Dance Music/Club Play	8
U.S. Billboard Hot Dance Music/Maxi Singles	33

Welcome, Machine Gun

Chart (1989)	Peak position
German Singles Chart	42
U.S. Billboard Dance Music/Club Play	7
U.S. Billboard Hot Dance Music/Maxi Singles	35

So Many People

Chart (1989)	Peak position
U.S. Billboard Dance Music/Club Play	7
U.S. Billboard Hot Dance Music/Maxi Singles	23

Cathy

Chart (1990)	Peak position
U.S. Billboard Dance Music/Club Play	14
U.S. Billboard Hot Dance Music/Maxi Singles	40

== Personnel ==
Hubert Kah

- Hubert Kemmler - vocals, producer, arrangement
- Markus Löhr - keyboards, guitar, producer, arrangement
- Klaus Hirschburger - bass, producer, arrangement

Additional personnel

- Peter Weihe - guitar
- Curt Cress - additional percussion
- Lothar Krell - additional keyboard on "Victim of Brain"
- Amy Goff - vocals on "Cathy"
- Annette Humpe - vocals on "Carrousel" and "The Voice of Silence"
- Inga Humpe - vocals on "Carrousel" and "The Voice of Silence"
- Michael Cretu - producer, recording, mixer, additional keyboards
- Frank Peterson - assistant engineer
- Mike Schmidt - artwork
- Stefan Langer - photography
