= Innocent Love (Sandra song) =

1986 single by Sandra

Single by Sandra

from the album Mirrors
- B-side: "Innocent Theme"
- Released: June 1986
- Genre: Synthpop
- Length: 5:23 (Album Version); 3:50 (Single Version); 6:42 (Extended Version)
- Label: Virgin
- Songwriters: Hubert Kemmler; Ulrich Herter; Susanne Müller; Klaus Hirschburger
- Producers: Michael Cretu; Armand Volker

Sandra singles chronology
"Little Girl" (1986)	"Innocent Love" (1986)	"Hi! Hi! Hi!" (1986)

Licensed audio
- "Innocent Love" on YouTube

"Innocent Love" is a song by German singer Sandra. It was written by Hubert Kemmler, Ulrich Herter, Susanne Müller and Klaus Hirschburger, and it was produced by Michael Cretu and Armand Volker. The song was released as the first single from Sandra's second solo album, Mirrors. The single was commercially successful, reaching the top 10 in Norway and France and the top 20 in Switzerland and West Germany.

The music video for the song was directed by DoRo (Rudi Dolezal and Hannes Rossacher). The clip was released on Sandra's VHS video compilations Ten on One (The Singles) and 18 Greatest Hits, released in 1987 and 1992, respectively, as well as the 2003 DVD The Complete History.

A new remix of the song was included on Sandra's 2006 retrospective Reflections.

== Track listings ==
- 7-inch single

A. "Innocent Love" – 3:50
B. "Innocent Theme" – 3:26

- 12-inch single

A. "Innocent Love" (extended) – 6:47
B. "Innocent Theme" – 3:26

== Charts ==
=== Weekly charts ===
Chart (1986)	Peak position
Europe (European Hot 100 Singles)	5
Europe (European Airplay Top 50)	49
France (SNEP)	10
Greece (IFPI)	3
Norway (VG-lista)	6
Spain (AFE)	30
Switzerland (Schweizer Hitparade)	14
West Germany (GfK)	11

=== Year-end charts ===
Chart (1986)	Position
Europe (European Hot 100 Singles)	55
