= The Way I Am (Sandra song) =

Single by Sandra

from the album The Art of Love
- B-side: "Logical Love"; "Sleep"
- Released: 26 January 2007
- Genre: Pop
- Length: 3:30
- Label: Virgin
- Songwriter(s): Jens Gad, Sandra Cretu, Andru Donalds
- Producer(s): Jens Gad

Sandra singles chronology
"Secrets of Love" (2006)	"The Way I Am" (2007)	"In the Heat of the Night (2007)" (2007)

Licensed audio
- "The Way I Am (Radio Edit)" on YouTube

"The Way I Am" is a pop song by German singer Sandra, written by Jens Gad, Sandra and Andru Donalds, and produced by Gad. It was released as the lead single from Sandra's eighth studio album The Art of Love in January 2007. The single included two non-album tracks, "Logical Love" and "Sleep", the latter an alternative version of the track "Casino Royale" from The Art of Love. "Sleep" is a cover of "Sleep with Me" released by Polish singer Edyta Górniak in 2002, which in turn has been originally performed by electronic act Conjure One featuring singer Marie-Claire D'Ubaldo. "The Way I Am" was moderately successful on the German singles chart. No official music video has been filmed for the song.

== Formats and track listings ==
- CD maxi single/digital download
1. "The Way I Am" (Radio Edit) – 3:30
2. "The Way I Am" (Extended Club Edit) – 6:59
3. "The Way I Am" (Lounge Edit) – 5:06
4. "Logical Love" – 3:33
5. "Sleep" (Alternative Version "Casino Royale") – 3:21

== Charts ==
Chart (2007)	Peak position
Germany (Media Control)	50
Poland ZPAV	38
Russia Tophit	110
