= Andy mein Freund =

Single by Sandra Ann
- B-side: "Ich bin noch ein Kind"
- Released: August 1976
- Recorded: 1976
- Genre: Pop
- Length: 3:57
- Label: BASF
- Songwriter: Gerd Schille
- Producer: George Roman

Sandra Ann singles chronology
"Andy mein Freund" (1976)	"Japan ist weit" (1984)

"Andy mein Freund" (meaning "Andy, My Friend") is a 1976 pop song performed by German singer Sandra. It was released as her debut single, under the moniker Sandra Ann, when the singer was only 14 years old.

== Background ==
The song is performed in German and was written by Gerd Schille, arranged by Udo Schwendler, and produced by George Roman. The title translates "Andy My Friend" and the lyrics are about a dog named Andy. Another German-language song was featured on side B, "Ich bin noch ein Kind" ("I Am Still a Child"), also written by Schille and produced by Roman, but arranged by Stefan Klinkhammer. Neither of the two songs has ever been re-released on CD or digitally.

The single was released only in Germany in August 1976 and performed poorly on the charts which were dominated by disco at that time, leaving Sandra to withdraw from the music scene for a few years. In 1979, she joined the female group Arabesque with which she achieved considerable commercial success, before re-launching solo career in 1984.

== Track listing ==
- 7" single

A. "Andy mein Freund" – 3:57
B. "Ich bin noch ein Kind" – 3:58
