= Around My Heart =

1989 single by Sandra

Single by Sandra

from the album Into a Secret Land
- B-side: "Around My Drums"
- Released: 1 May 1989
- Genre: Pop; disco
- Length: 3:18 (album version); 3:11 (single version)
- Label: Virgin
- Songwriters: Hubert Kemmler; Markus Löhr; Sör Otto's; Frank Peterson; Klaus Hirschburger
- Producer: Michael Cretu

Sandra singles chronology
"We'll Be Together" (1989)	"Around My Heart" (1989)	"Hiroshima" (1990)

Licensed audio
- "Around My Heart" on YouTube

"Around My Heart" is a pop song performed by German singer Sandra. It was written by Hubert Kemmler, Markus Löhr, Sör Otto's, Frank Peterson and Klaus Hirschburger and produced by Michael Cretu. The song was released as the fourth single from Sandra's third studio album Into a Secret Land in spring 1989 and was a top 20 hit in Germany and Switzerland. It also reached no. 12 on the German airplay chart.

The music video was directed by Bulle Bernd. The clip was released on Sandra's VHS video compilation 18 Greatest Hits in 1992 as well as the 2003 DVD The Complete History.

In 1999, a remix of the song was released on Sandra's compilation My Favourites. The track was remixed again for her 2006 compilation Reflections and released as a promotional radio single in Poland where it became a top 5 airplay hit.

== Critical reception ==
A review in Pan-European magazine Music & Media presented "Around My Heart" as a "smooth disco" song and "a slick, efficient production from Michael Cretu".

== Formats and track listings ==
- 7" single

A. "Around My Heart" (Single Version) – 3:11
B. "Around My Drums" (Instrumental) – 3:13

- 12" maxi single

A. "Around My Heart" (Extended Version) – 6:02
B1. "Around My Drums" (Instrumental) – 3:13
B2. "Around My Heart" (Single Version) – 3:11

- CD maxi single
1. "Around My Heart" (Single Version) – 3:11
2. "Around My Heart" (Extended Version) – 6:02
3. "Around My Drums" (Instrumental) – 3:13

== Charts ==
=== Weekly charts ===
Chart (1989)	Peak position
Austria (Ö3 Austria Top 40)	23
Europe (Eurochart Hot 100 Singles)	44
France (SNEP)	28
Switzerland (Swiss Hitparade)	19
West Germany (Media Control)	11

Chart (2007)	Peak position
Poland (Polish Airplay Charts)	5

=== Year-end charts ===
Chart (1989)	Position
West Germany (Media Control)	82
