= Forever (Sandra song) =

Single by Sandra

from the album The Wheel of Time
- Released: October 2001
- Recorded: 2001
- Genre: Pop
- Length: 3:45
- Label: Virgin
- Songwriters: Peter Ries, Wolfgang Filz
- Producers: Michael Cretu, Jens Gad

Sandra singles chronology
"Secret Land" (1999)	"Forever" (2001)	"Such a Shame" (2002)

Licensed audio
- "Forever" on YouTube

"Forever" is a 2001 pop song by German singer Sandra. It is a love ballad written by Peter Ries and Wolfgang Filz, and produced by Michael Cretu and Jens Gad. The song was released in October 2001 as the lead single from Sandra's seventh studio album The Wheel of Time and was a minor success on the official German chart. Music website AllMusic rated the song 3.5 out of 5 stars.

"Forever" was accompanied by a music video directed by Thomas Job, which was released on the 2003 DVD The Complete History.

== Track listing ==
- CD maxi single
1. "Forever" (Radio Edit) – 3:45
2. "Forever" (Straight 4 U Radio Edit) – 3:31
3. "Forever" (Beatnik Club Mix) – 8:57
4. "Forever" (Straight 4 U Remix) – 5:43

== Charts ==
Chart (2001)	Peak position
Germany (Official German Charts)	47
Romania (Romanian Top 100)	74
