= Tensongs =

Studio album by Hubert Kah
- Released: 1986
- Genre: Synthpop, new wave
- Label: Blow Up, CBS, Sony, Curb, Polydor
- Producer: Michael Cretu, Armand Volker

Hubert Kah chronology
Goldene Zeiten (1984)	Tensongs (1986)	Sound of My Heart (1989)

Tensongs is the fourth studio album by the German synthpop band Hubert Kah, and their first English language album, released in 1986. It was produced by Michael Cretu and Armand Volker. Three singles were released from the album: "Limousine", "Something I Should Know" and "Love Is So Sensible". The opening track "Pogo the Clown" is based on the American serial killer John Wayne Gacy. "Get Strange" is featured in the 1986 film Rad.

== Track listing ==
No.	Title	Writer(s)	Length
1.	"Pogo the Clown"	Markus Löhr, Nikolai Karo, Hubert Kemmler, Klaus Hirschburger, Ken Taylor	3:30
2.	"Lonesome Cowboy"	Löhr, Karo, Kemmler, Hirschburger, Taylor	4:06
3.	"Drowning"	Löhr, Karo, Kemmler, Taylor	3:47
4.	"Something I Should Know"	Karo, Kemmler, Taylor	3:29
5.	"Explain the World in a Word"	Löhr, Karo, Kemmler, Taylor	4:11
6.	"Love is So Sensible"	Ulrich Herter, Matthew Peevers	3:48
7.	"Get Strange"	Löhr, Karo, Kemmler, Richard Palmer-James	3:06
8.	"That Girl"	Karo, Kemmler, Taylor	3:51
9.	"Limousine"	Löhr, Kemmler, Hirschburger, Susanne Müller	4:02
10.	"Under My Skin"	Löhr, Kemmler, Palmer-James	4:24

1986 Japanese CD reissue bonus track
No.	Title	Writer(s)	Length
11.	"The Picture (remix)"	Kemmler, Löhr, Hirschburger, James, Killer	3:25

== Chart performance ==
=== Album ===
Chart (1986)	Peak position
German Albums Chart	35
Swiss Albums Chart	21

=== Singles ===
Limousine

Chart (1986)	Peak position
German Singles Chart	8
Swiss Singles Chart	25

Something I Should Know

Chart (1986)	Peak position
German Singles Chart	49

== Personnel ==
Hubert Kah

- Hubert Kemmler - vocals, backing vocals on "Love is So Sensible", arrangement
- Markus Löhr - guitar, keyboards, arrangement
- Klaus Hirschburger - bass, arrangement

Additional personnel

- Curt Cress - drums
- Lothar Krell - keyboard arrangement on "Limousine"
- Eddie Taylor - saxophone on "Something I Should Know"
- Ken Taylor - voice on "Lonesome Cowboy" and bass on "Explain the World in a Word"
- Thomas Dörr - backing vocals on "Love Is So Sensible"
- Judy Cheeks, Patricia Shockley, Victoria Miles - backing vocals on "Limousine"
- Michael Cretu - producer, arranger, digital and conventional keyboards
- Armand Volker - producer, arranger, guitar solo on "Love is So Sensible"
- Mike Schmidt - artwork
