= Secret Land =

Single by Sandra

from the album Into a Secret Land
- B-side: "Into Nobody's Land"
- Released: 26 September 1988
- Recorded: 1988
- Genre: Dance-pop, synthpop
- Length: 4:45 (album version); 4:05 (single version): 6:30 (Reverse Mix)
- Label: Virgin
- Songwriters: Uwe Gronau, Hubert Kemmler, Michael Cretu, Mats Björklund, Susanne Müller-Pi, Klaus Hirschburger, Michael Höing
- Producer: Michael Cretu

Sandra singles chronology
"Heaven Can Wait" (1988)	"Secret Land" (1988)	"We'll Be Together" (1989)

Licensed audio
- "Secret Land" on YouTube

Alternative cover
- Cover of the 1999 re-release

Sandra singles chronology
"Won't Run Away" (1995)	"Secret Land" (1999)	"Forever" (2001)

"Secret Land" is a 1988 pop song by German singer Sandra. It was written by Uwe Gronau, Hubert Kemmler, Michael Cretu, Mats Björklund, Susanne Müller-Pi, Klaus Hirschburger and Michael Höing, and produced by Cretu. It is an adaptation of the 1987 Kemmler-produced song "Trenchcoat Man" recorded by the short-lived German band Fabrique, the members of which were Gronau and Höing.

"Secret Land" was released in September 1988 as the second single preceding Sandra's third studio album, Into a Secret Land. The song charted in the top 10 in Germany and Switzerland, and reached the top 20 in a number of other European countries. It was also a no. 11 and no. 13 airplay hit in Germany and Austria, respectively. It also charted on the pan-European airplay chart at no. 43 and no. 24 on the sales chart.

In 1999, a remix of the song was released on Sandra's compilation My Favourites. It was released as a single to promote the album, but only met with minor success in Germany. The track was remixed again for her 2006 compilation Reflections.

== Music videos ==
The music video was directed by Bulle Bernd and filmed in the French regions of Normandy and Brittany, respectively in the Mont-Saint-Michel and along the shores of the walled port city of Saint-Malo. The clip was released on Sandra's VHS video compilation 18 Greatest Hits in 1992 as well as the 2003 DVD The Complete History.

A new music video was filmed for the 1999 remix, directed by Thomas Job, which was also released on The Complete History DVD.

== Critical reception ==
A review in Pan-European magazine Music & Media stated that the "breathy semi-spoken vocals in the intro, a la Donna Summer, lead into a naggingly effective song".

== Formats and track listings ==
- 7" single (1988)

A. "Secret Land" — 4:05
B. "Into Nobody's Land" — 4:12

- 12" maxi single & CD maxi single (1988)

A. "Secret Land" (Reverse Mix) — 6:44
B1. "Secret Land" (Single Version) — 4:05
B2. "Secret Land" (Dub Mix) — 3:33

- CD maxi single (1999)
1. "Secret Land" (Radio Edit) — 3:20
2. "Secret Land" (Ultra Violet Club Mix) — 5:34
3. "Secret Land" (La Danca Club Mix) — 6:12
4. "Secret Land" (Ultra Violet Radio Edit) — 3:41

== Charts ==
Chart (1988)	Peak position
Austria (Ö3 Austria Top 40)	17
Denmark (IFPI)	15
Europe (European Hot 100 Singles)	24
France (SNEP)	26
Germany (Official German Charts)	7
Netherlands (Single Top 100)	81
South Africa (Springbok Radio)	8
Spain (AFYVE)	26
Sweden (Sverigetopplistan)	15
Switzerland (Schweizer Hitparade)	9

Chart (1999)	Peak position
Germany (Official German Charts)	69
