= Into a Secret Land =

1988 studio album by Sandra

Studio album by Sandra
- Released: 24 October 1988
- Studio: A.R.T. (Ibiza, Spain)
- Genre: Dance-pop
- Length: 37:18
- Label: Virgin
- Producer: Michael Cretu

Sandra chronology
Ten on One (The Singles) (1987)	Into a Secret Land (1988)	Everlasting Love (1988)

Singles from Into a Secret Land
- 1. "Heaven Can Wait" Released: May 1988; 2. "Secret Land" Released: September 1988; 3. "We'll Be Together" Released: January 1989; 4. "Around My Heart" Released: March 1989

"La vista de luna" single cover

Into a Secret Land is the third studio album by German singer Sandra, released on 24 October 1988 by Virgin Records. The album was commercially successful and spawned the singles "Heaven Can Wait", "Secret Land", "We'll Be Together" and "Around My Heart".

== Background and release ==
The album was recorded at Sandra and Michael Cretu's home studio in Ibiza, Spain, where the couple had recently relocated and married in January 1988. It was the only Sandra album with every song co-written by Hubert Kemmler, and her last to feature his trademark backing vocals, until Stay in Touch (2012).

Into a Secret Land reached the top 10 in Switzerland and Finland, and the top 20 in Germany, Austria and Norway. It has been certified platinum in both France and Switzerland, and remains one of Sandra's best-selling albums.

The album was supported by four singles: "Heaven Can Wait" and "Secret Land" in 1988, followed by "We'll Be Together" and "Around My Heart" in 1989. All four singles reached the top 10 or top 20 in numerous European charts. "La vista de luna" was released as a promotional single in Spain in 1989.

== Track listing ==
Side one
No.	Title	Lyrics	Music	Length
1.	"Secret Land"	Susanne Müller-Pi; Klaus Hirschburger; Michael Höing	Uwe Gronau; Hubert Kemmler; Michael Cretu; Mats Björklund	4:45
2.	"We'll Be Together"	Kemmler; Hirschburger	Kemmler; Markus Löhr; Sandra Cretu	4:10
3.	"Heaven Can Wait"	Hirschburger; Kemmler	M. Cretu; Kemmler; Löhr	4:04
4.	"Just Like Diamonds"	Hirschburger; Kemmler	Kemmler; M. Cretu; Löhr	5:40

Side two
No.	Title	Lyrics	Music	Length
5.	"Around My Heart"	Hirschburger; Kemmler	Kemmler; Löhr; Sör Otto's; Frank Peterson	3:18
6.	"Crazy Juliet"	Hirschburger	Kemmler; M. Cretu; Löhr	4:11
7.	"La vista de luna"	Hirschburger; M. Cretu; Müller-Pi	M. Cretu; Kemmler	3:44
8.	"Celebrate Your Life"	Hirschburger; Kemmler	Kemmler	3:28
9.	"Children of England"	Hirschburger; Kemmler	Kemmler; Löhr	3:58
Total length:				37:18

== Personnel ==
Credits adapted from the liner notes of Into a Secret Land.

- Sandra – lead vocals
- Michael Cretu – production, mixing
- Frank Peterson – mixing
- Hubert Kemmler – backing vocals (uncredited)
- Mike Schmidt – cover
- Pepe Botella – photography

== Charts ==
=== Weekly charts ===
Weekly chart performance for Into a Secret Land
Chart (1988)	Peak position
Austrian Albums (Ö3 Austria)	13
European Albums (Music & Media)	30
Finnish Albums (Suomen virallinen lista)	10
French Albums (IFOP)	14
German Albums (Offizielle Top 100)	14
Norwegian Albums (VG-lista)	18
Swedish Albums (Sverigetopplistan)	22
Swiss Albums (Schweizer Hitparade)	9

=== Year-end charts ===
Year-end chart performance for Into a Secret Land
Chart (1989)	Position
European Albums (Music & Media)	65
German Albums (Offizielle Top 100)	40

== Certifications ==
Certifications for Into a Secret Land
Region	Certification	Certified units/sales
Austria (IFPI Austria)	Gold	25,000^{*}
France (SNEP)	Platinum	300,000^{*}
Germany (BVMI)	Gold	250,000^{^}
Sweden (GLF)	Platinum	100,000^{^}
Switzerland (IFPI Switzerland)	Platinum	50,000^{^}
^{*} Sales figures based on certification alone.^{^} Shipments figures based on certification alone.
