= Little Girl (Sandra song) =

- 7" single

Single by Sandra

from the album The Long Play
- B-side: "Sisters and Brothers"
- Released: February 24, 1986
- Recorded: before November 11, 1985
- Genre: Europop
- Length: 3:11 (Album Version) = 5:17 (Extended Version)
- Label: Virgin
- Songwriters: Michael Cretu, Hubert Kemmler, Markus Löhr, Klaus Hirschburger
- Producer: Michael Cretu

Sandra singles chronology
"In the Heat of the Night" (1985)	"Little Girl" (1986)	"Innocent Love" (1986)

Alternative cover
- 12" single

Licensed audio
- "Little Girl" on YouTube

"Little Girl" is a 1985 pop song performed by German singer Sandra. It was composed by Michael Cretu, Hubert Kemmler (known as Hubert Kah), and Markus Löhr to lyrics written by Klaus Hirschburger. Cretu also produced the track. The song was released as the third and final single from Sandra's debut album The Long Play in early 1986. It did not repeat the commercial success of the two previous singles, but still managed to reach the top 3 in Greece, the top 10 in Italy and the top 20 in Germany and Switzerland. It also reached no. 12 and no. 13 on the German and Austrian airplay charts, respectively.

== Music video ==
The music video was directed by Mike Stiebel and filmed in Venice, Italy in early 1986. It begins with Sandra strolling across a columbarium, stopping in front of a plaque of a girl named Angela Venezia who died in 1797. The plaque is decorated with the girl's portrait and a Venetian mask. Sandra sees the ghost of that girl by a canal and is then haunted by her, seeing her image and the mask in a restaurant, a postcard stand, an antique shop, and other places she visits. When the ghost of the girl appears to her again, she follows it, but is lured into a secluded courtyard where she finds herself surrounded by a group of ghosts wearing carnival masks. Scared, the singer runs away and in the final scene comes across the little girl again.

The clip was included in Sandra's VHS video compilations Ten on One (The Singles) and 18 Greatest Hits, released in 1987 and 1992, respectively, as well as the 2003 DVD The Complete History.

== Formats and track listings ==
- 7" single

A. "Little Girl" – 3:11
B. "Sisters and Brothers" – 3:23

- 12" single

A. "Little Girl" (Extended Version) – 5:09
B. "Sisters and Brothers" – 3:23

== Charts ==
Chart (1986)	Peak position
Austria (Ö3 Austria Top 40)	27
Belgium (Ultratop 50 Flanders)	38
Europe (European Top 100 Singles)	48
Greece (IFPI)	3
Italy (Musica e dischi)	6
South Africa (Springbok Radio)	24
Switzerland (Schweizer Hitparade)	18
West Germany (GfK)	14

== Covers ==
In 1987, Hong Kong singer David Lui covered "Little Girl" in Cantonese as "同時寂寞人".
