= Secrets of Love =

Single by DJ BoBo and Sandra

from the album Greatest Hits
- Released: 3 March 2006
- Genre: Pop
- Length: 3:17
- Label: Yes
- Songwriters: René Baumann, Axel Breitung
- Producers: René Baumann, Axel Breitung

DJ BoBo singles chronology
"Amazing Life" (2005)	"Secrets of Love" (2006)	"Vampires Are Alive" (2007)

Sandra singles chronology
"I Close My Eyes" (2002)	"Secrets of Love" (2006)	"The Way I Am" (2007)

Music video
- "Secrets of Love" on YouTube

"Secrets of Love" is a 2006 pop song performed as a duet by Swiss singer DJ BoBo and German singer Sandra. The song was written and produced by DJ BoBo and Axel Breitung.

It was released on 3 March 2006 to promote DJ BoBo's compilation Greatest Hits and was a commercial success, peaking at no. 5 in Switzerland and no. 13 in Germany. The music video was directed by Robert Bröllochs and filmed in Disneyland Paris.

== Formats and track listings ==
- CD single
1. "Secrets of Love" (Radio Version) — 3:17
2. "Secrets of Love" (Club Mix Radio Edit) — 3:59
- CD maxi single
1. "Secrets of Love" (Radio Version) — 3:17
2. "Secrets of Love" (Club Mix Radio Edit) — 3:59
3. "Secrets of Love" (Club Mix) — 6:42
4. "Secrets of Love" (Instrumental) — 3:19

"Secrets of Love" (Video) — 3:19

== Charts ==
=== Weekly charts ===
Chart (2006)	Peak position
Austria (Ö3 Austria Top 40)	39
Czech Republic Airplay (ČNS IFPI)	59
Europe (European Hot 100 Singles)	44
Germany (Media Control)	13
Switzerland (Swiss Hitparade)	5

=== Year-end charts ===
Chart (2006)	Position
Switzerland (Schweizer Hitparade)	79
