= One More Night (Sandra song) =

Single by Sandra

from the album Paintings in Yellow
- B-side: "The Journey"
- Released: September 1990
- Genre: Pop
- Length: 3:41 (single version); 4:06 (album version)
- Label: Virgin
- Songwriters: Michael Cretu, Klaus Hirschburger, Frank Peterson
- Producer: Michael Cretu

Sandra singles chronology
"(Life May Be) A Big Insanity" (1990)	"One More Night" (1990)	"Don't Be Aggressive" (1992)

Licensed audio
- "One More Night" on YouTube

"One More Night" is a pop ballad performed by German singer Sandra. The song was written by Michael Cretu, Klaus Hirschburger and Frank Peterson, and produced by Cretu. It was released as the third and final single from Sandra's fourth studio album, Paintings in Yellow, in September 1990. The single also includes the song The Journey. The single became only a moderate top 40 hit in Germany.

The music video for the song was directed by Dieter Trattmann and is set on the beaches of the Balearic Islands. The clip was released on Sandra's VHS video compilation 18 Greatest Hits in 1992 and the 2003 DVD The Complete History.

A remix of the song was included on Sandra's 2006 retrospective Reflections.

== Formats and track listings ==
- 7" single
1. "One More Night" (Single Version) – 3:41
2. "The Journey" (Edit) – 2:42
- 12" single

A1. "One More Night" (Extended Version) – 5:08
A2. "One More Night" (Single Version) – 3:41
B. "The Journey" (Album Version) – 7:27

- CD maxi single
1. "One More Night" (Single Version) – 3:41
2. "The Journey" (Album Version) – 7:27
3. "One More Night" (Extended Version) – 5:08

== Charts ==
Chart (1990)	Peak position
Germany (Official German Charts)	31
