= Nights in White Satin =

1967 single by the Moody Blues

- French single sleeve

Single by the Moody Blues

from the album Days of Future Passed
- B-side: "Cities"
- Released: 3 November 1967; August 1972 (Re-release); October 1979 (Re-release)
- Recorded: 8 October 1967
- Genre: Symphonic rock; proto-prog; pop
- Length: 5:38 (album version); 3:06 (single version number 1); 4:26 (single version number 2)
- Label: Deram
- Songwriter: Justin Hayward
- Producer: Tony Clarke

The Moody Blues singles chronology
"Love and Beauty" (1967)	"Nights in White Satin" (1967)	"Tuesday Afternoon" (1968)

Audio sample
- "Nights in White Satin": file; help

"Nights in White Satin" is a song by English rock band the Moody Blues, written by Justin Hayward. It was first featured as the segment "The Night" on the album Days of Future Passed. When first released as a single in 1967, it reached number 19 on the UK Singles Chart and number 103 in the United States in 1968. It was the first significant chart entry by the band since "Go Now" and its recent line-up change, in which Denny Laine and Clint Warwick had resigned and both Hayward and John Lodge had joined.

When reissued in 1972, the single hit number two in the US for two weeks on the Billboard Hot 100 (behind "I Can See Clearly Now" by Johnny Nash) and hit number one on the Cash Box Top 100, making it the band's most successful single in the US. It earned a gold certification for sales of over a million US copies (platinum certification was not instituted until 1976). It also hit number one in Canada. After two weeks at number 2, it was replaced by "I'd Love You to Want Me" by Lobo. It reached its highest UK position this year at number nine. Although the song did not enter the official New Zealand chart, it reached number five on the New Zealand Listener's chart compiled from the readers' votes in 1973. The 1972 single release of "Nights in White Satin" was inducted into the Grammy Hall of Fame in 1999.

The song enjoyed a recurring chart presence in the following decades. It charted again in the UK and Ireland in 1979 reaching numbers 14 and 8, respectively. The song charted again in 2010, reaching number 51 in the British Official Singles Charts. It has also been covered by numerous other artists, most notably Giorgio Moroder, Elkie Brooks, and Sandra, and has been used in a variety of cultural mediums, including commercials and films.

== Production ==
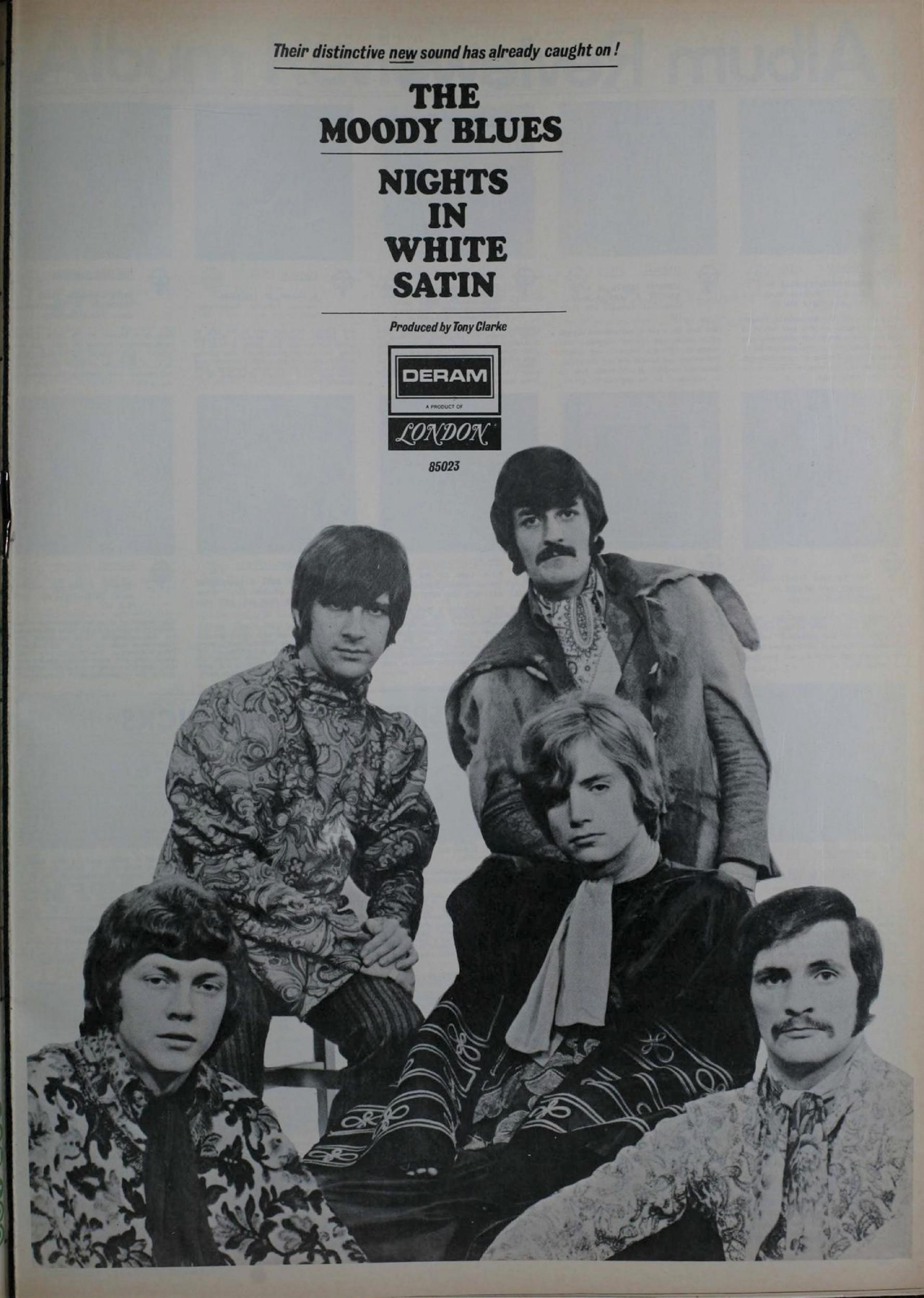
Billboard advertisement, 17 February 1968

Band member Justin Hayward wrote and composed the song at age 19 while touring in Belgium and titled the song after a girlfriend gave him a gift of satin bedsheets. Hayward said of the song, "It was just another song I was writing and I thought it was very powerful. It was a very personal song and every note, every word in it means something to me and I found that a lot of other people have felt that very same way about it." Hayward also said:

So with "Nights", I sat on the side of the bed and just wrote the two verses. I was at the end of one big love affair and the beginning of another. These are the things that boys, when they're in the middle of love affairs, they think about. Every word in that song makes perfect sense to me, but trying to explain it to someone is difficult. I mean, I lived every one of the lines in that song.

Hayward also remembered playing the song for the band for the first time, when he was a new member of the band:

I played it to everyone in the rehearsal room, and people were mostly indifferent. But then Mike [Pinder] said, "Play it again." He'd just gotten his Mellotron and he went [sings Pinder's string-sample riff]. Suddenly everyone was interested and the song just seemed to make sense. It was a little bit of relief, you know? I was sure the other guys were thinking, We'll get rid of this guy as soon as we can and move on, because if you've got nothing to offer, it doesn't make any difference if you're in or out. It's always an interesting dynamic in a young group.

The London Festival Orchestra provided the orchestral accompaniment for the introduction, the final rendition of the chorus, and the "final lament" section, all of which were in the original album version. The "orchestral" sounds in the main body of the song were actually produced by Mike Pinder's Mellotron keyboard device, which would come to define the "Moody (Blues)'s signature sound".

The song is written in the key of E minor and features its Neapolitan chord (F).

== Single releases ==
The two single versions of the song were both stripped of the orchestral and "Late Lament" poetry sections of the LP version. The first edited version, with the songwriter's credit shown as "Redwave", was a hasty-sounding 3:06 version of the LP recording with very noticeable chopped parts. However, many versions of the single are listed on the labels at 3:06, but in fact are closer to the later version of 4:26.

Some versions, instead of ending cold as most do, segue briefly into the symphonic second half ("Late Lament") and, in fact, run for 4:33 (but are also listed on the label as 3:06). For the second edited version (with the song's writing credited to Hayward), the early parts of the song were kept intact, ending early at 4:26. Most single versions were backed with a non-LP B-side, "Cities".

== Reception ==
Although it had only limited commercial success on its first release, the song has since garnered much critical acclaim, ranking number 36 in BBC Radio 2's "Sold on Song Top 100" list.

Cash Box said that the "intense mood of the funk orchestration serves up an atmosphere that penetrates to the very core of this depressed love ballad" and praised the "terrific instrumental break and a searing vocal."

Classic Rock critic Malcolm Dome rated it as the Moody Blues' greatest song, calling it "one of the best singles from the late 60s." Ultimate Classic Rock critic Nick DeRiso rated it as the Moody Blues' 2nd greatest song. Classic Rock History critic Brian Kachejian rated it as the Moody Blues' 8th greatest song, calling it "a great song, a beautiful historic song."

Graeme Edge credits the song's belated success in 1972 to autonomous DJs in the United States who would play the song despite its length. He explains to Rolling Stone in 2018: "There used to be things called regional breakouts. Instead of the big conglomerate radio stations like now, there were these FM guys and they had their own playlists. DJs were stars in those days and they prided themselves on discovering new talent. We had a regional breakout in Seattle. I think after the breakout started happening, there was a decision to re-promote it in other areas. It spread from Seattle down to San Francisco and down to L.A. It was going great everywhere, slowly going up the charts again until in the end it got to Number Two. But it sold a hell of a lot of records because it took so long to get up there."

== "Late Lament" ==
The spoken-word poem heard near the six-minute mark of the album version of the song is called "Late Lament". Drummer Graeme Edge wrote the verses, which were recited by keyboardist Mike Pinder. On Days of Future Passed, the poem's last five lines bracket the album and also appear at the end of track 1 ("The Day Begins").

While it has been commonly known as part of "Nights in White Satin" with no separate credit on the original LP, "Late Lament" was given its own listing on the two-LP compilation This Is The Moody Blues in 1974 and again in 1987 (without its parent song) on another compilation, Prelude. Both compilations feature the track in a slightly different form than on Days of Future Passed, giving both spoken and instrumental tracks an echo effect. The orchestral ending is kept intact, but mastering engineers edited out the gong (struck by Mike Pinder) that closes the track on the original LP as it relates to the closing of the original album (with Side 1 beginning with the gong fading in) and not the track alone.

From 1992 through the early 2000s, the Moody Blues toured with shows backed by live orchestras. When with orchestral accompaniment, they often took the opportunity to include "Late Lament" in the performance of "Nights in White Satin". On these occasions, Edge recited it himself, since Pinder had left the band.

== Personnel ==
Personnel per Sound on Sound.

The Moody Blues

- Justin Hayward – lead and backing vocals, acoustic guitar
- Ray Thomas – flute, backing vocals
- Mike Pinder – Mellotron, spoken word (on "Late Lament")
- John Lodge – bass, backing vocals
- Graeme Edge – drums

Additional personnel

- London Festival Orchestra
- Peter Knight – orchestral arrangements, conducting

== Charts ==
=== Weekly charts ===
Chart (1967–1968)	Peak position
Argentina	9
Belgium (Ultratop 50 Flanders)	6
Belgium (Ultratop 50 Wallonia)	1
Canada Top Singles (RPM)	30
Netherlands (Single Top 100)	1
Switzerland (Schweizer Hitparade)	6
UK Singles (OCC)	19
US Billboard Hot 100	103
West Germany (Media Control)	21

Chart (1972–1973)	Peak position
Australia (Kent Music Report)	8
Canada Top Singles (RPM)	1
Ireland (IRMA)	15
New Zealand (Listener)	5
South Africa (Springbok)	20
UK Singles (OCC)	9
US Billboard Hot 100	2
US Adult Contemporary (Billboard)	37
US Cash Box Top 100	1

Chart (1979)	Peak position
Ireland (IRMA)	8
UK Singles (OCC)	14

Chart (2013)	Peak position
Austria (Ö3 Austria Top 40)	55
France (SNEP)	95
Germany (Media Control)	39

=== Year-end charts ===
Chart (1972)	Rank
Canada	40
US Billboard	32
US Cash Box Top 100	82

== Certifications ==
Region	Certification	Certified units/sales
United Kingdom (BPI)	Gold	400,000^{‡}
United States (RIAA)	Gold	1,000,000^{^}
^{^} Shipments figures based on certification alone.^{‡} Sales+streaming figures based on certification alone.

== Sandra version ==
"Nights in White Satin"

Single by Sandra

from the album Fading Shades
- Released: April 1995
- Genre: Pop
- Length: 3:35
- Label: Virgin
- Songwriter: Justin Hayward
- Producer: Michael Cretu

Sandra singles chronology
"Maria Magdalena" (1993)	"Nights in White Satin" (1995)	"Won't Run Away" (1995)

Licensed audio
- "Nights In White Satin (Radio Edit)" on YouTube

A cover version of "Nights in White Satin" was released by German singer Sandra on her sixth studio album, Fading Shades (1995). It was produced by Michael Cretu.

The song was released as the lead single off Fading Shades in the spring of 1995 by Virgin Records and failed to match the success of Sandra's previous singles. The song only reached number 86 in Germany, becoming her least successful lead single there to date, and number 34 in New Zealand, where it remains her only charting single. It fared much better in Israel where it peaked at number one, and was a top-20 hit in Finland, and a top-10 airplay hit in Poland.

=== Reception ===
Pan-European magazine Music & Media wrote, "Some might say it can't be done, some might even say it shouldn't be done: Still Sandra has done it, and very well too. Enigma-fied, the Moody Blues classic is now '90s-worthy."

=== Music video ===
The accompanying music video for "Nights in White Satin", directed by Angel Hart, showed only close-ups of Sandra's face as she was pregnant at the time. A still from the video was later used on the Fading Shades album cover. The music video was released on Sandra's 2003 DVD The Complete History.

=== Formats and track listings ===
- CD maxi single
1. "Nights in White Satin" (Radio Edit) — 3:35
2. "Nights in White Satin" (Club Mix) — 6:05
3. "Nights in White Satin" (Techno Mix) — 5:29
4. "Nights in White Satin" (Jungle Mix) — 6:09
5. "Nights in White Satin" (Dub Version) — 4:02
- 12" maxi single

A1. "Nights in White Satin" (Club Mix) — 6:05
A2. "Nights in White Satin" (Techno Mix) — 5:29
B1. "Nights in White Satin" (Jungle Mix) — 6:09
B2. "Nights in White Satin" (Dub Version) — 4:02

=== Charts ===
==== Weekly charts ====
Chart (1995)	Peak position
Australia (ARIA)	163
Germany (Official German Charts)	86
Israel (Israeli Singles Chart)	1
New Zealand (Recorded Music NZ)	34

==== Year-end charts ====
Chart (1995)	Position
Israel (Israeli Singles Chart)	49

== Elkie Brooks version ==
English singer Elkie Brooks recorded the song for her 1982 album Pearls II.

=== Formats and track listings ===
- 7 single UK and Ireland

A. Nights In White Satin 4:35
B. Lilac Wine (Live Recording) 6:08

- 7 single promo

A. Nights In White Satin 4:35
B. Lilac Wine (Live Recording) 6:08

- 7 single New Zealand and Australia

A. Nights In White Satin 4:37
B. Thank You For The Light 3:31

- 7 single Spain

A. Nights In White Satin 4:35
B. Lilac Wine (Live Recording) 6:08

=== Charts ===
Chart (1982)	Peak position	Ref.
Ireland (IRMA)	14	
UK Singles (OCC)	33	

== Other cover versions ==
- Italian band Nomadi released a version of the song as a single in 1968 with the title Ho difeso il mio amore reaching number 20 in the Italian chart. The lyrics of this version differ significantly from the original.
- New Zealand band "American Eagle" covered the song on their only studio album "American Eagle in 1970.
- German singer Juliane Werding covered the song in German as "Wildes Wasser" for her 1973 album Mein Name ist Juliane. The single reached number 40 in Germany.
- Giorgio Moroder recorded the song as "Knights in White Satin" for a 1976 album of the same name. His cover reached number 44 on the Walloon singles chart in Belgium. Moroder recorded another version in 1983 with Joe Bean Esposito on vocals, for the album Solitary Men.
- Los Angeles punk rock band the Dickies recorded a cover of the song for their 1979 LP Dawn of the Dickies. Released as a single, it charted in the top 40 on the UK singles charts.
- Hong Kong singer-songwriter Jacky Cheung recorded a Mandarin cover in 1988.
- The group Il Divo released their cover "Nights in White Satin (notte di luce)" on the 2006 album Siempre. Their version reached number 81 in Switzerland.
- A cover by the Dutch singer Erwin Nyhoff reached the top 5 in the Netherlands in 2012.
- Rachael Leahcar recorded a cover of the song for her debut album Shooting Star (2012). The song reached number 43 in Australia.
- Oceans of Slumber recorded a cover of the song for their album Winter (2016).
- Progressive rock supergroup Transatlantic released a cover of the song on the special edition bonus disc of their album Kaleidoscope (2014).
- The Relentless released a cover of the song on their album American Satan (2018).
- British metal band Nightwing released a cover of the song on their album Nightwing VI (1988).

== In popular culture ==
Nights in White Satin was the title of a 1987 film directed by Michael Barnard, and starring Kip Gilman and Priscilla Harris. The Moody Blues recording of the song was featured prominently in the soundtrack, particularly during a rooftop dance sequence.

The work was reinterpreted as the focus of Nights in White Satin: The Trip, a dark ride at the Hard Rock Park theme park in Myrtle Beach, South Carolina, USA. The attraction, which included 3D-black light and fibre-optic lighting effects and purpose-made films, was developed by Sally Corporation and Jon Binkowski of Hard Rock Park. Riders entered through a bead curtain and were provided with 3D glasses.

The attraction operated as "The Trip" for the single 2008 season the park operated as Hard Rock Park, but was rethemed as "Monstars of Rock" with the sale and retitling of the park as Freestyle Music Park; "park officials said the experience will be similar but the presentation will be changed." Freestyle Music Park would cease operations after its only season as such in 2009.

The song also gained further attention for its use in the 2012 Tim Burton film Dark Shadows, where it features as a prominent part of the soundtrack and saw use in marketing material.

In late 2023, the song was featured in a commercial for Bleu de Chanel featuring actor Timothée Chalamet.

The song was used in a commercial in November 2026 by Calvin Klein featuring Jude Bellingham.

== See also ==
- List of Cash Box Top 100 number-one singles of 1972
