= Don't Be Aggressive =

Single by Sandra

from the album Close to Seven
- B-side: "Seal It Forever"
- Released: January 1992
- Recorded: 1991
- Genre: Pop
- Length: 4:22 (single version); 4:45 (album version)
- Label: Virgin
- Songwriters: Michael Cretu, Klaus Hirschburger
- Producer: Michael Cretu

Sandra singles chronology
"One More Night" (1990)	"Don't Be Aggressive" (1992)	"I Need Love" (1992)

Licensed audio
- "Don't Be Aggressive (Radio Edit)" on YouTube

"Don't Be Aggressive" is a 1992 pop song by German singer Sandra. It was written by Michael Cretu and Klaus Hirschburger, and produced by Cretu. The song uses a sample of the 1990 track "Daydreaming" by Massive Attack, which in turn samples "Mambo" (1984) by Wally Badarou. It was released in January 1992 as the lead single from Sandra's fifth studio album Close to Seven, reaching the top 10 in Norway and Finland, and the top 20 in Germany.

The music video for the song was directed by Howard Greenhalgh. The clip was released on Sandra's VHS video compilation 18 Greatest Hits in 1992 and the 2003 DVD The Complete History.

== Formats and track listings ==
- CD maxi single
1. "Don't Be Aggressive" (Radio Edit) – 4:22
2. "Don't Be Aggressive" (The Midnight Hour Mix) – 6:23
3. "Seal It Forever" – 4:51
- 7" single

A. "Don't Be Aggressive" (Radio Edit) – 4:22
B. "Seal It Forever" – 4:51

- 12" single

A. "Don't Be Aggressive" (The Midnight Hour Mix) – 6:21
B1. "Seal It Forever" – 4:51
B2. "Don't Be Aggressive" (Radio Edit) – 4:22

== Charts ==
Chart (1992)	Peak position
Austria (Ö3 Austria Top 40)	30
Europe (Eurochart Hot 100 Singles)	39
Finland (Suomen virallinen lista)	8
France (SNEP)	39
Germany (Official German Charts)	17
Netherlands (Single Top 100)	51
Norway (VG-lista)	7
Sweden (Sverigetopplistan)	27
Switzerland (Schweizer Hitparade)	24
