= Fading Shades =

1995 studio album by Sandra

Studio album by Sandra
- Released: 12 June 1995
- Recorded: 1994–1995
- Studios: A.R.T. (Ibiza, Spain)
- Genre: Pop
- Length: 40:11
- Label: Virgin
- Producers: Michael Cretu; Jens Gad

Sandra chronology
18 Greatest Hits (1992)	Fading Shades (1995)	My Favourites (1999)

Singles from Fading Shades
- 1. "Nights in White Satin" Released: April 1995; 2. "Won't Run Away" Released: July 1995

"Won't Run Away" single cover

Fading Shades is the sixth studio album by German singer Sandra, released on 12 June 1995 by Virgin Records.

== Background ==
The majority of Fading Shades was recorded while Sandra was pregnant with twins, so she had to sit during the recording sessions. The album saw a new collaborator Jens Gad working alongside Michael Cretu as a writer, arranger, programmer and producer. Again, Andy "Angel" Hart performed all the male vocals on the album.

The album's sound continued the trend started with Close to Seven of her work becoming more experimental in nature. It featured influences from experimental rock, alternative rock, europop, and downtempo music. The musical departure perhaps stemmed from Gad's inclusion as a collaborator. Sandra's vocal talent is displayed more heavily on this album, although her presence on tracks is reduced in runtime to accommodate for complications from pregnancy.

The first single released from the album was a cover version of The Moody Blues song "Nights in White Satin", which reached number 34 in New Zealand and 86 in Germany, becoming one of Sandra's lowest-charting singles in her home country, despite a warm critical reception. It was more successful in Israel and Finland. The song's music video featured only close-ups of Sandra's face as she was heavily pregnant at the time. A still from the video served as the album cover.

"Won't Run Away" was released as the second and final single, and was Sandra's first single since 1984's "Japan ist weit" not to receive a music video. The CD single included three remixes of the song. It was commercially unsuccessful and did not enter any charts, apart from reaching lower regions of the German airplay top 100. The track "Son of a Time Machine" was a radio hit in South Africa.

The album is one of Sandra's least commercially successful releases, reaching number 42 in Germany and number 37 in Switzerland.

Robin Wessels and Gavin Stok both gave negative reviews of the album in July 1995, criticizing Jens Gad's production and the overuse of background vocals and electric guitars.

== Track listing ==
1. "Fading Shades" (Part I) (Jens Gad) – 1:02
2. "Nights in White Satin" (Justin Hayward) – 3:34
3. "Son of a Time Machine" (Jens Gad, Michael Cretu, Klaus Hirschburger) – 5:01
4. "Won't Run Away" (Jens Gad, Klaus Hirschburger) – 4:14
5. "Tell Me More" (Jens Gad, Klaus Hirschburger) – 3:15
6. "Will You Whisper" (Jens Gad, Klaus Hirschburger) – 4:13
7. "Invisible Shelter" (Jens Gad, Michael Cretu, Klaus Hirschburger) – 5:20
8. "You Are So Beautiful" (Jens Gad, Klaus Hirschburger) – 4:38
9. "I Need Love '95" (Michael Cretu, Klaus Hirschburger) – 3:28
10. "First Lullaby" (Michael Cretu, Jens Gad, KlausHirschburger) – 4:20
11. "Fading Shades" (Part II) (Jens Gad) – 1:06

== Charts ==
Chart performance for Fading Shades
Chart (1995)	Peak position
German Albums (Offizielle Top 100)	42
Swiss Albums (Schweizer Hitparade)	37
