= Heaven Can Wait (Sandra song) =

Single by Sandra

from the album Into a Secret Land
- B-side: "Heaven's Theme"
- Released: 30 May 1988
- Length: 4:05 (Single Version) = 7:36 (Extended Version)
- Label: Virgin
- Songwriters: Michael Cretu, Hubert Kemmler, Markus Löhr, Klaus Hirschburger
- Producer: Michael Cretu

Sandra singles chronology
"Stop for a Minute" (1988)	"Heaven Can Wait" (1988)	"Secret Land" (1988)

Licensed audio
- "Heaven Can Wait" on YouTube

Professional ratings
Review scores
Source	Rating
Number One	2/5 stars

"Heaven Can Wait" is a 1988 song performed by German singer Sandra and written by Michael Cretu, Hubert Kemmler (known as Hubert Kah), Markus Löhr and Klaus Hirschburger. It was arranged by Michael Cretu and Markus Löhr, and produced by Cretu. The song was released as the lead single from Sandra's third studio album Into a Secret Land in mid-1988. The single reached the top 10 in Austria and France, the top 20 in West Germany and Switzerland and was one of Sandra's few singles to enter the UK top 100. In Austria, it was also a top 10 airplay hit. It was Sandra's fourth and last silver-certified single in France.

The music video was directed by DoRo (Rudi Dolezal and Hannes Rossacher) in Ibiza. The clip was released on Sandra's VHS video compilation 18 Greatest Hits in 1992 as well as the 2003 DVD The Complete History.

In 1999, a remix of the song was released on Sandra's compilation My Favourites. The track was remixed again for her 2006 compilation Reflections.

== Formats and track listings ==
- 7-inch single

A. "Heaven Can Wait" – 4:05
B. "Heaven's Theme" (instrumental) – 4:05

- 12-inch maxi single and CD maxi single

A. "Heaven Can Wait" (extended version) – 7:38
B1. "Heaven Can Wait" (dub mix) – 4:01
B2. "Heaven Can Wait" (single version) – 4:05

== Charts ==
=== Weekly charts ===
1988 weekly chart performance for "Heaven Can Wait"
Chart (1988–89)	Peak position
Austria (Ö3 Austria Top 40)	4
Europe (Eurochart Hot 100)	18
France (SNEP)	6
Greece (IFPI)	2
Switzerland (Schweizer Hitparade)	16
UK Singles (OCC)	97
West Germany (GfK)	12

=== Year-end charts ===
1988 year-end chart performance for "Heaven Can Wait"
Chart (1988)	Position
Europe (Eurochart Hot 100)	59
West Germany (Media Control)	53

== Certifications ==
Region	Certification
France (SNEP)	Silver
