= We'll Be Together (Sandra song) =

Single by Sandra

from the album Into a Secret Land
- B-side: "It Means Forever"
- Released: 23 January 1989
- Genre: Pop
- Length: 4:10 (album version); 3:49 (single version)
- Label: Virgin
- Songwriters: Hubert Kemmler; Markus Löhr; Klaus Hirschburger; Sandra Cretu
- Producer: Michael Cretu

Sandra singles chronology
"Secret Land" (1988)	"We'll Be Together" (1989)	"Around My Heart" (1989)

Licensed audio
- "We'll Be Together" on YouTube

"We'll Be Together" is a pop song performed by German singer Sandra from her third studio album, Into a Secret Land. It was written by Hubert Kemmler, Markus Löhr, Klaus Hirschburger and Sandra Cretu, and produced by Michael Cretu. This is the only song along with "When the Rain Doesn't Come" (from the 1992 album Close to Seven) that was written or co-written by Sandra herself, prior to the 2007 album The Art of Love. It was released as the third single from Into a Secret Land in January 1989. For the single release, the song was remixed and labelled as the "'89 Remix". In 1999, a remix of the song was released on Sandra's compilation My Favourites. The track was remixed again for her 2006 compilation Reflections.

== Music video ==
The music video was directed by Bulle Bernd in Ibiza, Spain and Cannes, France. The clip was released on Sandra's VHS video compilation 18 Greatest Hits in 1992 as well as the 2003 DVD The Complete History.

== Critical reception ==
A review in Pan-European magazine Music & Media presented "We'll Be Together" like this: "As usual, unpretentious, catchy and danceable".

== Chart performance ==
"We'll Be Together" was a top ten hit in Germany and a top 20 hit in France and Austria. It also entered the top 20 on the German and Austrian airplay charts.

== Formats and track listings ==
- 7-inch single

A. "We'll Be Together" (single version) – 3:49
B. "It Means Forever" (instrumental) – 3:43

- 12-inch maxi single and CD maxi single

A. "We'll Be Together" (extended version) – 6:45
B1. "It Means Forever" (dub version) – 3:43
B2. "We'll Be Together" (single version) – 3:49

== Charts ==
=== Weekly charts ===
Weekly chart performance for "We'll Be Together"
Chart (1989)	Peak position
Austria (Ö3 Austria Top 40)	16
Europe (Eurochart Hot 100)	39
France (SNEP)	13
Switzerland (Schweizer Hitparade)	22
West Germany (GfK)	9

=== Year-end charts ===
Year-end chart performance for "We'll Be Together"
Chart (1989)	Position
West Germany (Media Control)	65
