= (I'll Never Be) Maria Magdalena =

1985 song by Sandra Cretu

- Cover of the original 1985 release

Single by Sandra

from the album The Long Play
- B-side: "Party Games" (instrumental)
- Released: 15 July 1985
- Length: 3:58 (7-inch single version); 7:07 (12-inch single version); 5:58 (album version)
- Label: Virgin
- Songwriters: Hubert Kemmler; Markus Löhr; Michael Cretu; Richard Palmer-James
- Producer: Michael Cretu

Sandra singles chronology
"Japan ist weit" (1984)	"(I'll Never Be) Maria Magdalena" (1985)	"In the Heat of the Night" (1985)
"Johnny Wanna Live" (1992)	"Maria Magdalena" (1993)	"Nights in White Satin" (1995)

Alternative cover
- Cover of the 1993 re-release

Music video
- "(I'll Never Be) Maria Magdalena" on YouTube

"(I'll Never Be) Maria Magdalena", also known simply as "Maria Magdalena", is a song recorded by German singer Sandra for her debut studio album The Long Play (1985). The song, written by Hubert Kemmler, Markus Löhr, Michael Cretu and Richard Palmer-James, was released as the lead single from The Long Play on 15 July 1985 by Virgin Records, and was a major chart hit in Europe, reaching number one in nine countries. It remains Sandra's signature song.

== Background and release ==
The song was composed by Hubert Kemmler, Markus Löhr and Michael Cretu. Cretu also arranged and produced the song. The lyrics were written by Richard Palmer-James. The allusion to the biblical figure Mary Magdalene was Kemmler's idea and came up when a name with seven syllables was needed for the chorus. However, only the German version of the name would be fit, because in English "Mary Magdalene" has five syllables. Kemmler also provided co-lead vocals on this recording and on a number of Sandra's subsequent songs.

The song was first released on 15 July 1985 as the lead single from Sandra's debut album, The Long Play. It was her third single as a solo artist, but the first solo single to be released internationally. Initially unsuccessful in its bid to gain radio play, the label targeted DJs in Greece and their tourist audiences next, and the song subsequently became a big hit there, where it topped the singles chart. Returning tourists requested the song at home, and it eventually reached number one on the West German singles chart for four consecutive weeks, between 13 September and 4 October 1985. The single then peaked at number one in Austria, Switzerland, Sweden, Norway, the Netherlands and Finland. It also reached number one on the airplay chart in West Germany as well as the top five in Austria. On the pan-European charts, it was a top-10 and a top-20 hit on the airplay and sales charts, respectively.

== Remixes and samples ==
In 1993 the same background music in the song "(I'll Never Be) Maria Magdalena" was used for the song "Vino noći", which was performed by the Croatian singer Neno Belan, the lead vocalist of the band Đavoli.

The song was re-released in a remixed version as a standalone single in 1993, but was not commercially successful, though it reached the top ten in Finland and the top twenty in Denmark. Music website AllMusic retrospectively rated it 2.5 out of 5 stars.

In 1999, another remix of the song was released only in France as a promotional single in support of Sandra's compilation album My Favourites. The track was interpolated again for her remix album Reflections (2006), and the original version was later sampled in the song "Kings & Queens" on her tenth album Stay in Touch (2012).

== Music videos ==
A simple performance music video was filmed in 1985, which presents Sandra accompanied by a bassist/backing vocalist Peter Ries, a drummer Wolfgang Filz and a keyboardist Frank Peterson. It was directed by Mike Leckebusch. The music video was released on Sandra's VHS video compilations Ten on One (The Singles) and 18 Greatest Hits, released respectively in 1987 and 1992, as well as the 2003 DVD The Complete History.

The industrial style video for the 1993 version was directed by Marcus Adams, and was also released on The Complete History DVD.

== Track listings ==
- 7-inch vinyl single

A. "(I'll Never Be) Maria Magdalena" – 3:58
B. "Party Games" (instrumental) – 3:25

- 12-inch vinyl single

A. "(I'll Never Be) Maria Magdalena" – 7:13
B. "Party Games" (instrumental) – 3:25

- CD maxi-single (1993)
1. "Maria Magdalena" (radio edit) – 3:58
2. "Maria Magdalena" (clubmix) – 6:01
3. "Maria Magdalena" (original version) – 3:58
- 12-inch vinyl single (1993)

A. "Maria Magdalena" (clubmix) – 6:01
B. "Maria Magdalena" (Vega Sicilia mix) – 5:36

- 12-inch vinyl single (1999)

A. "Maria Magdalena" (original version) – 3:58
B. "Maria Magdalena" (99 remix) – 3:59

== Charts ==
=== Weekly charts ===
Original version

Chart (1985–1986)	Peak position
Austria (Ö3 Austria Top 40)	1
Belgium (Ultratop 50 Flanders)	3
Denmark (Tracklisten)	3
Europe (European Top 100 Singles)	13
Finland (Suomen virallinen lista)	1
France (SNEP)	5
Greece (IFPI)	1
Italy (Musica e dischi)	2
Netherlands (Dutch Top 40)	1
Netherlands (Single Top 100)	2
Norway (VG-lista)	1
Portugal (AFP)	1
South Africa (Springbok Radio)	2
Spain (AFYVE)	2
Sweden (Sverigetopplistan)	1
Switzerland (Schweizer Hitparade)	1
UK Singles (Official Charts)	87
West Germany (GfK)	1

Chart (2026)	Peak position
Poland Airplay (OLiS)	87

Remix version

Chart (1993)	Peak position
Denmark (Tracklisten)	15
Finland (Suomen virallinen lista)	8

=== Year-end charts ===
Chart (1985)	Position
Austria (Ö3 Austria Top 40)	10
Belgium (Ultratop 50 Flanders)	37
Netherlands (Dutch Top 40)	19
Netherlands (Single Top 100)	18
Switzerland (Schweizer Hitparade)	10
West Germany (Media Control)	5

Chart (1986)	Position
Europe (European Hot 100 Singles)	70
South Africa (Springbok Radio)	13

== Certifications ==
Certifications for "(I'll Never Be) Maria Magdalena"
Region	Certification	Certified units/sales
France (SNEP)	Silver	250,000^{*}
Germany (BVMI)	Gold	500,000^{^}
^{*} Sales figures based on certification alone.^{^} Shipments figures based on certification alone.
