= Sandra (singer) =

German singer (born 1962)

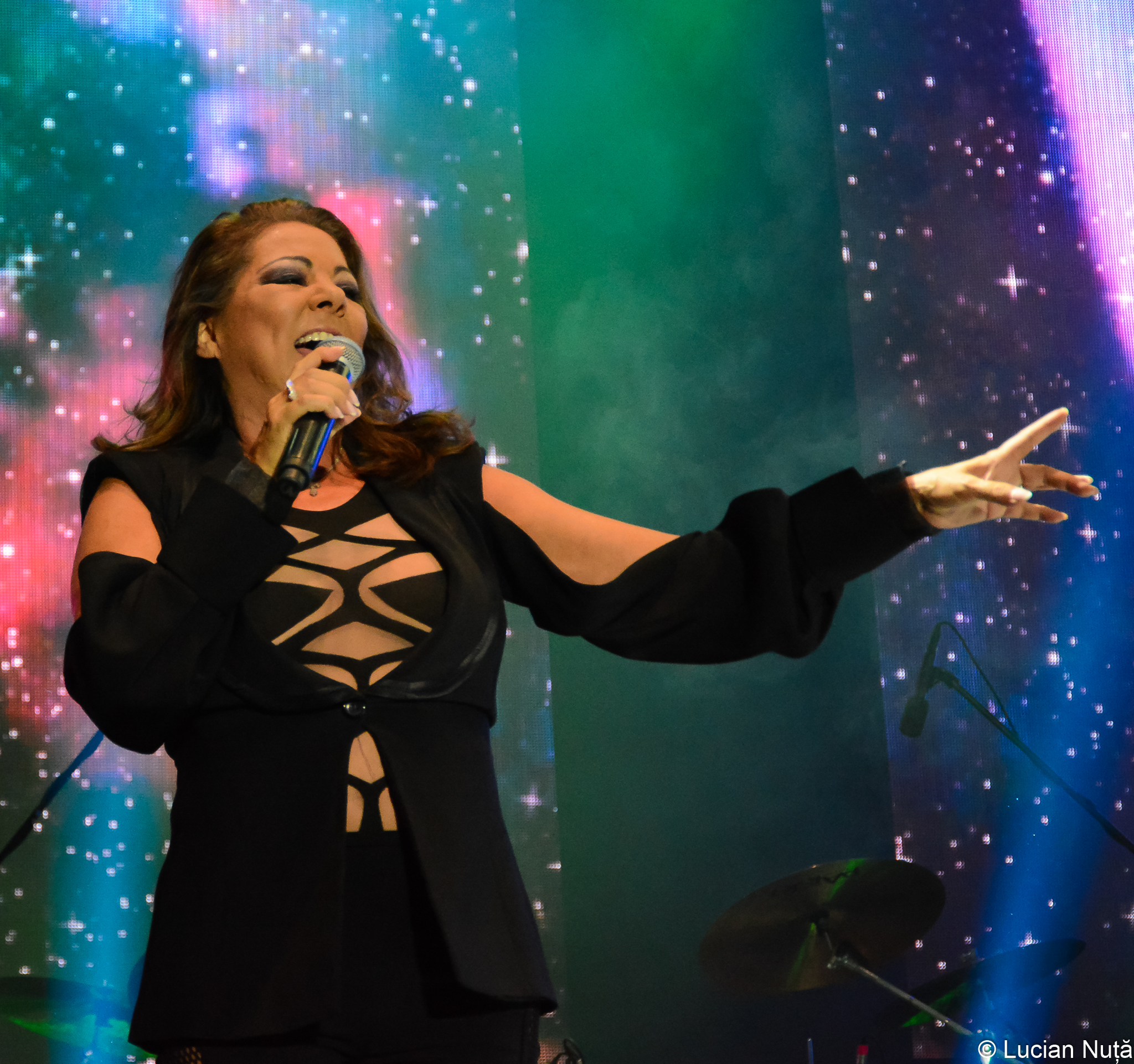
- Sandra in 2017

Background information
- Also known as: Sandra Cretu
- Born: Sandra Ann Lauer; 18 May 1962 (age 64); Saarbrücken, West Germany
- Genres: Pop; synth-pop; disco
- Works: Discography
- Years active: 1976–present
- Label: Virgin
- Formerly of: Arabesque; Enigma
- Spouse(s): Michael Cretu (m. 1988; div. 2007) Olaf Menges (m. 2010; sep. 2014)
- Website: sandra-music.com

Sandra Ann Lauer (born 18 May 1962), later Sandra Cretu, commonly known mononymously as Sandra (German pronunciation: [ˈzandʁa]), is a German pop singer who enjoyed mainstream popularity in the 1980s and early 1990s with a string of European hit singles, produced by her then-husband and musical partner, Michael Cretu, most notably "(I'll Never Be) Maria Magdalena" (1985), "In the Heat of the Night" (1985), "Everlasting Love" (1987), "Secret Land" (1988), "Hiroshima" (1990), and "Don't Be Aggressive" (1992). Her studio albums include Into a Secret Land (1988) and Close to Seven (1992).

Prior to embarking on a solo career, Sandra was the lead singer of the all-female disco trio Arabesque, which had a following in Japan and the Soviet Union. Also, between 1990 and 2003, she provided vocals on album releases of the musical project Enigma, which had top 10 hits in North America and the United Kingdom. Sandra remains a popular singer in Continental Europe. During the height of her popularity, she outsold Madonna in a number of countries around the world. With sales in excess of 33 million records worldwide, Sandra has established her position as the most successful German female vocalist.

== Biography ==
=== 1962–1984: Early life and Arabesque ===
Sandra Ann Lauer was born on 18 May 1962 in the German town of Saarbrücken, close to the French border. Her French-born father, Robert Lauer (1937–2021), owned a wine store in Saarbrücken, and German-born mother, Karin (née Eltern) (1939–2020), worked in a shoe store. Sandra had an older brother, Gaston, a paraplegic who died in 1995. She showed an early interest in music and dancing, taking classical ballet at the age of five and guitar lessons when she was 10. In 1975, at the age of 13, Sandra went with her mother to see Young Star Festival, a Saarbrücken talent competition. She was only a member of the audience, but when the participants had finished performing and the jury was discussing the results, Sandra walked onto the stage and persuaded the DJ to put on the German version of an Olivia Newton-John song. The impromptu performance gained considerable recognition and led to the release of her first single, a song about a pet dog, "Andy mein Freund". The single, however, performed poorly.

In 1979, now 17, Sandra joined Arabesque, a disco group consisting of Michaela Rose and Jasmine Vetter, and would become the band's lead singer. At that time, Sandra met keyboardist Michael Cretu. They found that they shared the same birthday, albeit five years apart, and became good friends. Arabesque became successful with their cheerful music and flamboyant costumes, winning a massive following in Japan and scoring a top 10 hit in Germany in 1981 with "Marigot Bay". After nine albums, emerging differences in musical interests of group members and decreasing popularity of disco/dance music signalled the group's break-up. Sandra and Michael Cretu, by then romantically involved, moved to Munich where Michael created his own studio, Data-Alpha, named after a song from his album Legionäre. Their first single together was 1984's "Japan ist weit", a German cover of the Alphaville song "Big in Japan". However, the song failed to chart with only 125 copies sold.

=== 1985–1992: Peak of international career ===
Sandra gained international success in 1985 with the song "(I'll Never Be) Maria Magdalena", which topped the charts in 21 countries and reached the top 10 in another five. Her first album, The Long Play (1985), reached number 12 in Germany and number 2 in Sweden. The follow-up single, "In the Heat of the Night", reached number two in Germany and the top 10 in many European countries. The song also earned Sandra second place at the Tokyo Music Festival in 1986. "Little Girl", accompanied by a music video filmed in Venice, became the third single from the album in 1986, but was met with moderate success. Shortly after the release of The Long Play, Sandra moved to London for six months to work with singing teacher Helena Shelen and take drum lessons. She also enrolled at the London Berlitz School of Languages to improve her English, returning to Germany on weekends to record new songs.

Sandra's second studio album, Mirrors, was released in October 1986 with "Innocent Love" chosen as the first single, followed by "Hi! Hi! Hi!". Both of these up-tempo synth-pop offerings achieved success in continental Europe. Two further singles from the album, the ballad "Loreen" and "Midnight Man", were only moderate successes. In 1987, Sandra released a cover version of "Everlasting Love", which she said had been her favourite song since childhood, to great international success. The single was a top 10 hit in German-speaking countries and charted within the top 20 internationally. The song was included on Sandra's first greatest hits compilation, Ten on One (The Singles).

Sandra and Michael Cretu married in January 1988 and moved to the Spanish island of Ibiza to work on what would be Sandra's third studio album. Into a Secret Land moved from electro-pop to more sophisticated areas of pop, showcased by the first single, "Heaven Can Wait". The second single, "Secret Land", met with even greater success, is considered one of her biggest solo hits while "We'll Be Together", released as the third single, was the first song she co-wrote. In order to promote her music in the English-speaking world, another compilation was released at the end of 1988, Everlasting Love. The album failed to enter the charts in the US or the UK but a PWL remix of the title track included on the album charted at number 45 in the UK. 1989 saw the release of the fin al single from Into a Secret Land, "Around My Heart", which became another chart hit. With animal rights and nature conservation high on her personal agenda, Sandra took part in recording "Yes We Can" with 15 other performers for Artists United for Nature.

Sandra's fourth album, Paintings in Yellow, was released in March 1990 and became her highest-charting album in her home country. "Hiroshima" was released as the lead single and was a hit. Danceable "(Life May Be) A Big Insanity" and ballad "One More Night" were released as the second and third singles off the album, respectively, but were only modest successes. Sandra accepted an award for the best-selling German artist at the 1990 World Music Awards in Monte Carlo. Also in 1990, the singer contributed vocals to four songs for her husband's musical project Enigma, including the worldwide number 1 hit "Sadeness (Part I)".

In early 1992, Sandra's fifth album was released, Close to Seven, which continued a more mature, less dance-orientated musical style. The album was a remarkable international success as was its lead single, "Don't Be Aggressive". However, the second single, "I Need Love", was her first since 1984 to fail to chart. Later in 1992, a new compilation was released, 18 Greatest Hits. It included most of her previous single songs and a re-recording of "Johnny Wanna Live", originally from Paintings in Yellow, which was released as a single and became a minor hit in Germany and the Netherlands.

=== 1993–2006: Comeback attempts ===
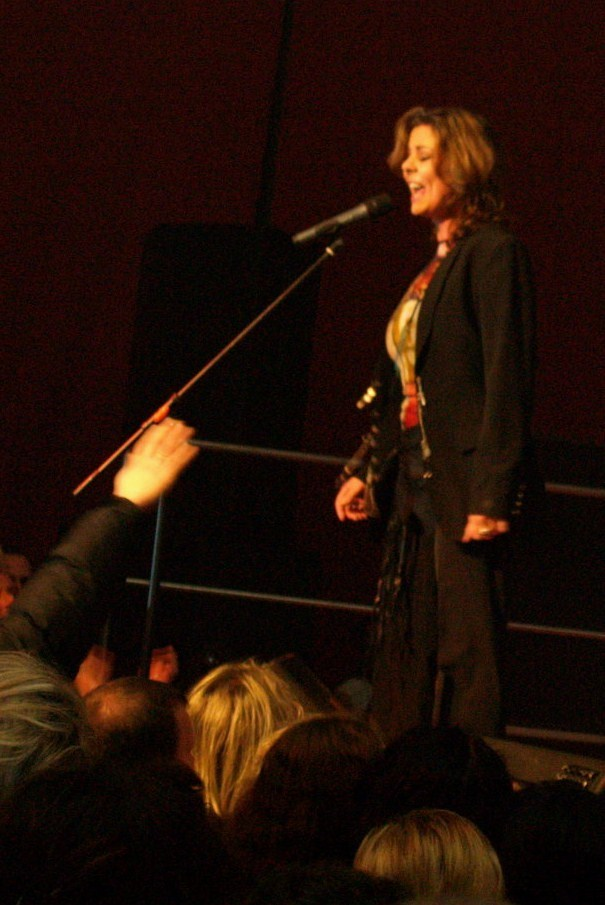
Sandra in 2007

In 1993, Sandra released a new version of "Maria Magdalena" with a techno arrangement and futuristic music video. The re-recording turned out to be a flop. Nonetheless, she sang on three songs on Enigma's next album, The Cross of Changes, including the hit single "Return to Innocence".

While pregnant with twins, Sandra recorded and released Fading Shades in 1995. The album saw new writer-producer Jens Gad working alongside Michael Cretu and comprised mostly pop-orientated material. A cover version of "Nights in White Satin" by The Moody Blues was released as the first single, becoming one of Sandra's lowest-charting singles in Germany, although it was a hit in Israel. The album met a lukewarm commercial and critical reception, and the second single, "Won't Run Away", failed to chart. After giving birth to sons Nikita and Sebastian in a Munich hospital through Caesarean section in July 1995, Sandra decided to put her career on hold. However, the following year she participated in recording two songs for Enigma's third album. 1999 saw the release of My Favourites, a double disc album featuring remixes of Sandra's older songs and some of her favourite ballads. It was a success, charting within the top 20 in some European countries. A new version of "Secret Land" was released as a single, accompanied by a music video in which Sandra sported a shorter hairstyle. Her vocals again appeared in two songs on Enigma's 2000 album The Screen Behind the Mirror as well as the project's 2001 single "Turn Around". She released ballad "Forever" in 2001, which was a minor chart success in Germany. It foreshadowed her next studio album, The Wheel of Time, eventually released in spring 2002, after several delays. The album was a chart success and met a positive critical response, producing two more singles, "Such a Shame", originally performed by Talk Talk, and another ballad "I Close My Eyes". In 2003, the DVD The Complete History was released, featuring all of her music videos. The same year, Sandra contributed vocals for Enigma's Voyageur album, which would mark the last time she worked with the project.

After several years' break, in 2006 Sandra teamed up with Swiss singer DJ BoBo for a duet "Secrets of Love" on his Greatest Hits album. The single was a big hit, reaching top 5 in Switzerland and top 20 in Germany. Sandra subsequently took up performing live again and began working on her next album. In late 2006, Reflections was released, an album consisting of remixes of Sandra's biggest hits. A new ballad version of "Everlasting Love" was released as a promotional single in Germany while the remix of "Around My Heart" proved to be a big radio hit in Poland.

=== 2007–present: a new musical direction ===
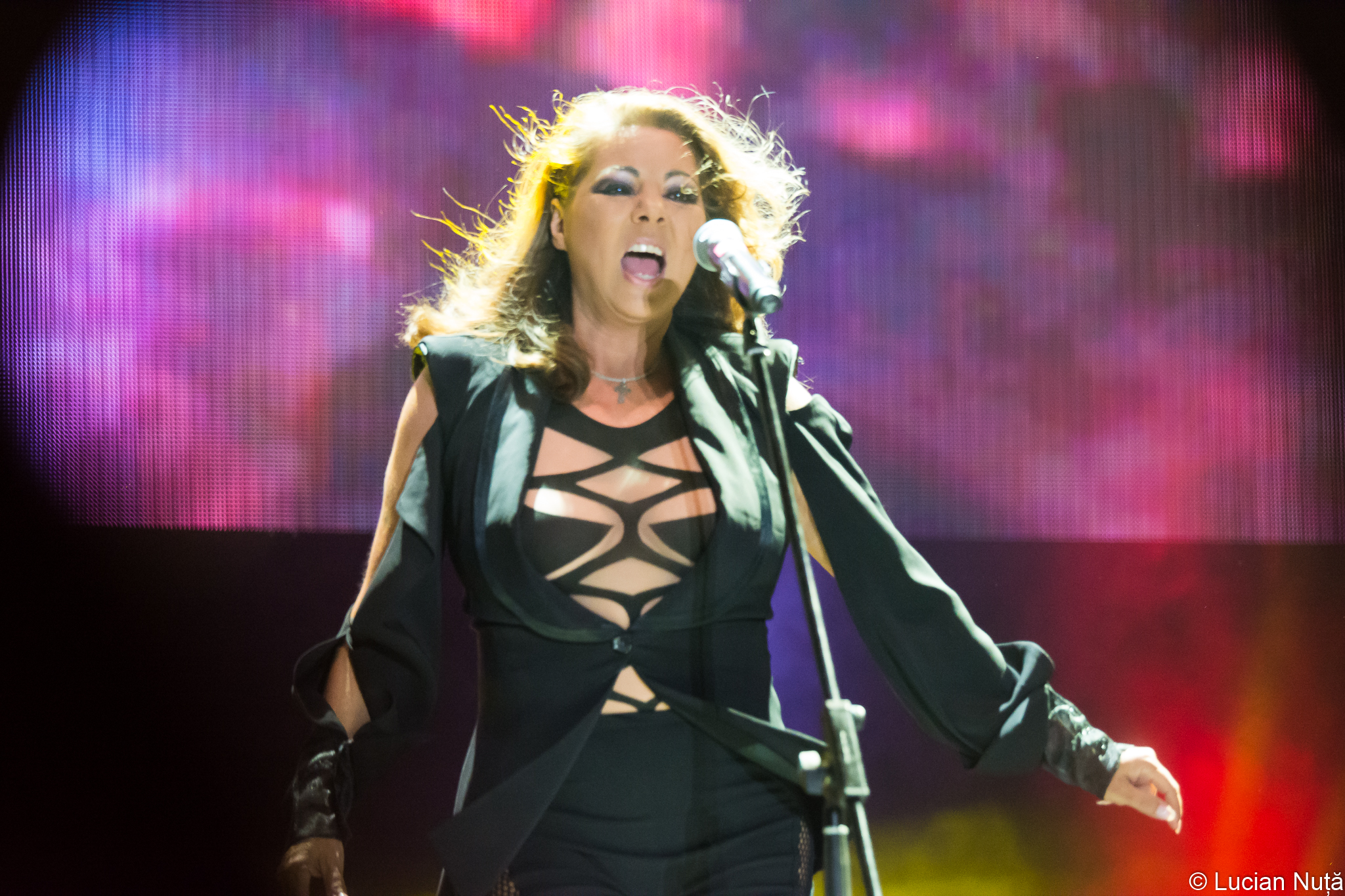
Sandra performing in 2017

The Art of Love, a studio album, was released in February 2007. It reached the top 20 in Germany and enjoyed minor success internationally. For the first time, Michael Cretu did not participate in recording one of her albums as he was reportedly busy with Enigma; Jens Gad produced the entire work. Sandra participated in composing and writing the album, making it a reflection of the struggles in her personal life. (In November 2007, Sandra and Michael divorced and she spent the following year touring Europe.) "The Way I Am" was the album's lead single, peaking at number 50 in Germany, while the second single, "What Is It About Me", failed to chart. However, her version of The Hooters' "All You Zombies" became a big radio hit in Poland.

Her next album, Back to Life, was released in March 2009, showcasing up-tempo material influenced by Latin pop, dance, and R&B. "In a Heartbeat" and "The Night Is Still Young", the latter featuring Thomas Anders of Modern Talking, were released as singles and had modest success in Germany. Later in 2009, a three-disc compilation titled The Platinum Collection was released, featuring all of Sandra's hit singles as well as some album tracks and extended versions.

2012 saw the release of Stay in Touch, Sandra's tenth studio album. Produced by German DJ duo Blank & Jones, the album incorporated 1980s sounds reminiscent of her early albums. "Maybe Tonight" was released as the first single and peaked at 77 in Germany, while the second single, "Infinite Kiss" failed to chart. However, the album was a modest success internationally and received a warm response.

In August 2014, her management was transitioned to Alexei Perschukewitsch.

== Personal life ==
Sandra and Michael Cretu, who share the same birthday, were married and became parents of twin sons. They later separated.

While Cretu has been living in Germany since May 2009, Sandra remained in Ibiza and married music producer Olaf Menges in 2010, but they separated in 2014.

== Awards and nominations ==
Award	Year	Nominee(s)	Category	Result	Ref.
Echo Music Prize	1993	Sandra	Best National Female	Won	
Echo Music Prize	1996	Sandra	Best National Female	Nominated	
Echo Music Prize	2000	Sandra	Best National Female	Nominated	
Echo Music Prize	2003	Sandra	Best National Female	Nominated	

== Discography ==
- The Long Play (1985)
- Mirrors (1986)
- Into a Secret Land (1988)
- Paintings in Yellow (1990)
- Close to Seven (1992)
- Fading Shades (1995)
- The Wheel of Time (2002)
- The Art of Love (2007)
- Back to Life (2009)
- Stay in Touch (2012)
