= Jens Gad =

German producer, songwriter, and guitarist

- Genres: Pop; New age; rock; dance
- Occupations: producer, songwriter, musician
- Years active: 1986 – present
- Website: jensgad.com

Jens Michael Gad is a German producer, songwriter and guitarist of Danish parents. He started making music at a young age.

Gad has produced music for many artists (e.g. Sandra Cretu and Sandra Gambino) and was previously co-producer for the musical project, Enigma. In the past he has released albums under the name of "Enigmatic Obsession", "Jens Gad Presents" for his new instrumental work, and also under the name of "Achillea", for his new world-influenced music which features different female vocalists on each album, singing in different languages.

Gad works from his 007 music studio in the city of Avalon on Catalina Island, off the coast of Los Angeles. Jens is the older brother of Toby Gad.

In 2019, Gad was featured in the Visual Collaborative Polaris catalogue for the creative sector, he was interviewed alongside people such as; Remi Vaughan-Richards, Bahia Shehab and Yvonne Sangudi.

In 2019 Jens worked with Sandra Gambino on her debut album Shades of Love.

== Projects ==
Jens Gad's own musical project, Achillea, has released two albums: The Nine Worlds (2005) in collaboration with singer Helene Horlyck and Amadas Estrellas (2007) in collaboration with Spanish singer Luisa Fernandez.

== Discography ==
=== Albums ===
- 1986: Contact – Fancy
- 1988: All or Nothing – Milli Vanilli
- 1989: NRG. – Q
- 1989: Love Is No Science – Münchener Freiheit
- 1991: Welcome to the Soul Asylum – Angel X
- 1993: The Cross of Changes – Enigma
- 1993: Sliver: Music from the Motion Picture – Enigma / BSO
- 1995: Will I Be Faithful? – Slavik...Kemmler
- 1995: Fading Shades – Sandra
- 1998: The Energy of Sound – Trance Atlantic Air Waves
- 1999: Snowin' Under My Skin – Andru Donalds
- 1999: My Favourites – Sandra
- 2000: The Screen Behind the Mirror – Enigma
- 2000: Freiheit Die Ich Meine – Münchener Freiheit
- 2001: Let's Talk About It – Andru Donalds
- 2001: Love Sensuality Devotion: The Greatest Hits – Enigma
- 2001: Love Sensuality Devotion: The Remix Collection – Enigma
- 2002: The Wheel of Time – Sandra
- 2003: Zeitmaschine – Münchener Freiheit
- 2003: Voyageur – Enigma
- 2005: Secrets of Seduction – released under the group name Enigmatic Obsession
- 2005: The Nine Worlds – released under the group name Achillea
- 2006: Le Spa Sonique – released under the recording artist name Jens Gad Presents
- 2007: Amadas Estrellas – released under the group name Achillea
- 2007: The Art of Love – Sandra
- 2009: Back to Life – Sandra
- 2021: Shades of Love – Sandra Gambino
- 2025: Secrets of Seduction (2025) – released under the group name Enigmatic Obsession
- 2026: The Lost Scripture (2026) – released under the group name Achillea feat. Amiya
