= Hubert Kah =

German synthpop band

Background information
- Origin: West Germany
- Genres: Synthpop, new wave
- Years active: 1982–present
- Labels: Polydor, Blow Up, RCA, Da Music, Ariola, Curb Records, What's Up ?!
- Members: Hubert Kemmler
- Past members: Markus Löhr; Klaus Hirschburger

Hubert Kah is a German synthpop band, led by Hubert Kemmler (born 21 March 1961), a German musician, composer, songwriter and producer.

== Biography ==
In 1982, the trio named Hubert Kah were formed, consisting of: Hubert Kemmler (vocals, keyboards), Markus Löhr (guitars, keyboards) and Klaus Hirschburger (bass). They emerged at the time of the New German wave, and achieved commercial success with the singles "Rosemarie," "Sternenhimmel" and "Einmal Nur Mit Erika... (Dieser Welt Entfliehn)", and with the albums Meine Höhepunkte and Ich Komme. During this time, Kemmler caused quite a stir by his TV appearances, wearing a nightdress or straitjacket. Before Kemmler's music career, he studied law at the University of Tübingen.

The band began working with producer Michael Cretu in 1984. After a West German album Goldene Zeiten (1984), it recorded the English-language albums Tensongs (1986) and Sound of My Heart (1989), which achieved minor success internationally. Together with Michael Cretu, Kemmler wrote and produced songs for other artists, including "Dancing into Danger" by Inker & Hamilton, "Liebe Auf Den Ersten Blick" by the band Münchener Freiheit and a number of tracks by Sandra, such as "Maria Magdalena", "Heaven Can Wait". Hubert Kemmler also contributed backing vocals to most of Sandra's hit singles between 1985 and 1989.

Kemmler was diagnosed with depression in the late 1980s and withdrew from music completely. After his recovery, he re-emerged with the self-titled Hubert Kah and the singles "C'est La Vie" and "Sailing." The production with classic elements was not commercially successful. In 1998, a new single "Love Chain" and a Best Of CD were released. Kemmler then became ill again and had to undergo medical treatment.

In 2005, Kemmler began his second comeback with the album Seelentaucher ("Soul Diver"). The first single was called "No Rain". The album featured a mixture of English and German language tracks.

In the spring of 2007, Kemmler toured Germany with the musical Princess Lillifee, where he played Ice King Kini. On 26 May 2007, he was one of four guests of honor at the acoustic concert of the band ASP, on the Wave-Gotik-Treffen 2007 in Leipzig.

Kemmler recorded new songs with Sandra for her new album Stay in Touch, which was released in late 2012.

=== 2021 disappearance and reappearance ===
In March 2021, several German media outlets reported that Kemmler and his wife had not been seen in months. However, Kemmler was reported as being seen at the Stuttgart hotel, celebrating his 60^{th} birthday, in March 2021.

== Discography ==
=== Studio albums ===
- Meine Höhepunkte (1982)
- Ich komme (1982)
- Goldene Zeiten (1984)
- Tensongs (1986)
- Sound of My Heart (1989)
- Hubert Kah (1996)
- Seelentaucher (2005)
- RockArt (2016)

=== Compilations ===
- Best of Dance Hits (1990)
- Best of Hubert Kah (1998)
- Rosemarie (1999)
- Portrait (1999)
- Meine Besten (2010)
- So80s (Soeighties) Presents Hubert Kah (2011)
- Willkommen im Leben (2014)
- The Very Best of Hubert Kah (2014)

=== EPs ===
- Niemand ist wie Du (September 2016)

=== Singles ===
- "Rosemarie" (February 1982)
- "Sternenhimmel" (September 1982)
- "Einmal Nur Mit Erika... (Dieser Welt Entfliehn)" (March 1983)
- "Scary Monster" (English version of "Sternenhimmel") (June 1983)
- "Engel 07" (April 1984)
- "Wenn der Mond die Sonne berührt" (September 1984)
- "Angel 07" (English version of "Engel 07") (June 1985)
- "Goldene Zeiten" (August 1985)
- "Limousine" (April 1986)
- "Something I Should Know" (September 1986)
- "Love Is So Sensible" (1986)
- "Military Drums" (May 1987)
- "Welcome, Machine Gun" (March 1989)
- "So Many People" (July 1989)
- "It's Me, Cathy (Follow My Heart)" (1990)
- "C'est la Vie" (1995)
- "C'est la Vie" (re-release) (October 1996)
- "Sailing" (February 1997)
- "Love Chain (...Maria)" (1998)
- "Der NDW Kult Mix" (1998)
- "No Rain" (2005)
- "Psycho Radio" (2005)
- "Sekunden" (2005)
- "Terrorist der Liebe" (with Joachim Witt) (July 2016)
- "Niemand ist wie du" (September 2016)
- "Parfum deiner Liebe" (October 2016)
- "The Picture" (Francois Kevorkian Mixes) (March 2023)
- "Engel 07" (Re-Release)

(April 2024)

- "Wenn Der Mond Die Sonne Berührt" (Re-Release) (October 2024)
- "Angel 07" (Re-Release) (February 2025)
- "Isn't It Lovely" (March 2025)

=== Other appearances ===
- "The Picture" – Once Bitten Soundtrack (1985)
- "Sternenhimmel" – In the Mix feat. Hubert Kah (August 2014)
- "Rosemarie" – Tom Franke feat. Hubert Kah (June 2017)
- Helden EP – Totem Obscura feat. Hubert Kah (May 2018)
