= Michael Cretu =

German musician (born 1957)

- Born: Mihai Crețu; 18 May 1957 (age 69); Bucharest, Romanian People's Republic
- Genres: New-age; new wave; downtempo; disco; synth-pop
- Occupations: Musician; composer; producer
- Instruments: Vocals; keyboards; piano; guitar; drums
- Years active: 1976–present
- Labels: Virgin; Polydor; East West
- Member of: Enigma
- Formerly of: Moti Special
- Spouse: Sandra (m. 1988; div. 2007)
- Website: enigmaspace.com

Michael Cretu (Romanian: Mihai Crețu, pronounced [miˈhaj ˈkretsu]; born 18 May 1957) is a Romanian-German musician, singer, songwriter, composer, and record producer. He gained worldwide fame as the founder and musician behind the musical project Enigma, which he formed in 1990.

Cretu began his music career in 1976 as a solo artist, releasing three studio albums as well as writing and producing albums for his then-wife, German pop singer Sandra. He also worked with other artists through the 1980s, including Peter Cornelius, Hubert Kah, and Mike Oldfield. Cretu was sometimes identified as "Curly" or "Curly M.C.", in reference to his curly hair and creț meaning "curly" in Romanian.

He scored an unexpected worldwide commercial hit with the debut Enigma album, MCMXC a.D. (1990), helped by its lead single, "Sadeness (Part I)". The project's most recent album is 2016's The Fall of a Rebel Angel, its eighth overall. Enigma has sold an estimated 70 million albums worldwide, and Cretu's produced recordings have sold 100 million copies.

== Early life ==
Cretu was born on 18 May 1957 in Bucharest, Romania, to a Romanian father and Austrian mother. In 1965, he studied piano and classical music at Colegiul Tehnic Nr. 2 in Bucharest, followed by further study in Paris for five months in 1968. Around this time, he decided to pursue a career in pop music after listening to the Beatles' "Golden Slumbers", calling the song "beautiful". After he informed his mother, Cretu recalled: "She goes, 'Aaargh! Disaster! Do you want to end up starving?'" In 1975, Cretu relocated to Bad Homburg, West Germany, and studied at the Academy of Music in Frankfurt, where he graduated with a degree in musical composition in 1978.

== Career ==
=== 1976–1988: Session work and solo career ===
After graduating from the Academy of Music, Cretu remained in West Germany and took up work as a session musician. Among his first jobs was playing keyboards for producer and recording artist Frank Farian, which included work on Boney M's "Rivers of Babylon". In 1981, Cretu co-formed the new wave band Moti Special with other session players. Their debut album, Motivation (1985), included the single "Cold Days, Hot Nights", which became a hit around Europe. Cretu left the group before they released their second album, in 1990.

His first solo album, titled Moon, Light & Flowers, came out in 1979. It contains the singles "Shadows Over My Head" and "Wild River", released in 1978, and "Moonlight Flower" and "Love Me". His second album, Legionäre, came out in 1983. Cretu's third album, Die Chinesische Mauer, was released in 1985 and featured the song "Samurai". It was issued separately with English-language lyrics and a different track listing under the name The Invisible Man.

=== Collaborations and projects ===
In 1980, Cretu cowrote the song "Woman Behind the Man" with Peter Franken, for ex-Ebony singer Isetta Preston, producing it as well.

Sandra

In 1985, he produced, arranged, and played keyboards, drums, and programming on The Long Play, the debut studio album by West German pop singer Sandra.

Peter Cornelius

In 1980, Cretu began a collaboration with the Austrian musician Peter Cornelius, contributing music and production to five of the latter's albums, including Der Kaffee ist fertig (1980, Zwei (1980), Reif für die Insel (1981), Ohne Filter (1982), and Fata Morgana (1983). In 1992, the two collaborated once more, this time on the joint album Cornelius + Cretu. A year later, Cornelius contributed guitars to the second Enigma album, The Cross of Changes.

Hubert Kah

Also in the 1980s, Cretu took over production for the pop quartet Hubert Kah and began writing songs with the band leader Hubert Kemmler, achieving a number of hits. Among his other work, Cretu was one of the producers on Mike Oldfield's 1987 album, Islands, and the producer of Peter Schilling's 1989 record, The Different Story (World of Lust and Crime).

Cretu & Thiers

In 1988, Cretu released an album with former Moti Special bandmate Manfred Thiers, titled Belle Epoque.

Trance Atlantic Air Waves

In 1998, Cretu teamed up with musician and producer Jens Gad on the project Trance Atlantic Air Waves, which released one album, The Energy of Sound, the same year.

A.R.T. Studios

Cretu formerly owned the A.R.T. Studios in Ibiza. His house, near Sant Antoni de Portmany, was a Moroccan-style mansion that featured a recording studio. The Spanish High Court deemed it to have been built illegally and in infringement of environmental regulations, which led to the €18 million villa being razed in May 2009.

=== 1988–present: Enigma ===
Cretu was encouraged to pursue a solo project by Mike Oldfield, who was impressed by his studio production skills and musical ideas. This led to the creation of the musical project Enigma, which Cretu said was born from the idea of making music that he himself liked, while bringing in a sense of mysticism. The formation of Enigma involved Fabrice Cuitad, under the alias of David Fairstein, and Frank Peterson. The trio worked together to create their groundbreaking debut single, "Sadeness (Part I)", which became a surprise international hit. MCMXC a.D., the debut album, released in 1990, was hugely successful.

Cretu has stated that was not surprised by the album's unexpected success, as he recalled telling his wife before its release, "This will be a huge hit or nothing at all". His style of mixing a variety of musical genres, samples, and sounds was unfamiliar to the listening public at the time, and it led to him being described as an "alchemist in sound".

Enigma's second album, The Cross of Changes, was released in 1993. Peterson had disagreements with Cretu by the time of recording and left the project in 1991. On this album, Cretu pivoted away from Gregorian chants, present throughout MCMXC a.D., as numerous artists had started to use them in their music, to tribal chants, as heard on the international hit single "Return to Innocence". The same year, he was approached by Paramount Pictures to contribute to the soundtrack for the film Sliver, and he came up with another single, "Carly's Song", after the main female character's name.

In 1996, Enigma released its third album, Le Roi est mort, vive le Roi!. Stylistically, it sounded like a combination of the first and second albums. It did not achieve the same level of success, though it sold over one million copies in the United States and received Gold certification in the United Kingdom nonetheless.

In 1999, Cretu steered the project in another direction by using samples of Carl Orff's Carmina Burana on the fourth album, The Screen Behind the Mirror, released a year later. This was the first Enigma record to feature Andru Donalds and Ruth-Ann Boyle, both of whom would provide vocals for several more of the project's albums. Although Jens Gad had worked with Cretu on earlier Enigma records, this was the first time that he received a liner credit.

In 2001, Cretu released two Enigma compilation albums, Love Sensuality Devotion: The Greatest Hits and Love Sensuality Devotion: The Remix Collection, which include credits to ATB. By this time, Enigma had achieved close to an estimated 30 million sales worldwide. In 2002, Cretu won a World Music Award for Best-Selling German Artist.

Cretu continued to record Enigma albums, releasing Voyageur in 2003. Familiar sounds of the Shakuhachi flute and tribal or Gregorian chants were replaced with more commercially friendly tunes and beat. In 2006, a new single, titled "Hello and Welcome", was issued in anticipation of another album, A Posteriori, which came out later that year.

Seven Lives Many Faces, Enigma's seventh studio album, was published in 2008.

The project's latest release, The Fall of a Rebel Angel, came out in 2016.

== Personal life ==
Cretu and Sandra, who share the same birthday, were married on 7 January 1988; they have twin sons, born in July 1995. They lived in Ibiza, Spain, in a home that also housed A.R.T. Studios, where Enigma albums were produced. In November 2007, the couple divorced. The Ibiza home was bulldozed in 2009 after Cretu lost a legal battle over building permission. After the divorce, Cretu remarried. As of 2017, he lived in Munich.

Cretu is known as an artist who keeps a low profile, giving few interviews and avoiding concert tours. He speaks four languages.

== Discography ==
=== Solo ===
Albums

- 1979 – Moon, Light & Flowers (re-released in Germany in 1994 as Ausgewählte Goldstücke)
- 1983 – Legionäre (English edition: Legionnaires)
- 1985 – Die Chinesische Mauer (English edition: The Invisible Man)

Singles

- 1978 – "Shadows Over My Head"
- 1978 – "Wild River"
- 1979 – "Moonlight Flower"
- 1979 – "Love Me"
- 1983 – "Total Normal"
- 1983 – "Zeitlose Reise"
- 1983 – "Der Planet der verlorenen Zeit"
- 1983 – "Today, Today"
- 1984 – "Schwarzer Engel"
- 1985 – "Carte Blanche"
- 1985 – "Die Chinesische Mauer"
- 1985 – "Samurai" (German version)
- 1985 – "Samurai (Did You Ever Dream)" (English version)
- 1985 – "Silver Water"
- 1986 – "Gambit"
- 1987 – "School's Out" (Cretu & Thiers)
- 1987 – "When Love Is the Missing Word" (Cretu & Thiers)
- 1988 – "Don't Say You Love Me (Let Me Feel It)" (Cretu & Thiers)
- 1988 – "Captain Right" (Cretu & Thiers)
- 1992 – "Rettungsringe sterben aus" (Cornelius + Cretu)
- 1992 – "Nur die Hoffnung nicht" (Cornelius + Cretu)

=== Enigma ===
- 1990 – MCMXC a.D.
- 1993 – The Cross of Changes
- 1996 – Le Roi Est Mort, Vive Le Roi!
- 2000 – The Screen Behind the Mirror
- 2003 – Voyageur
- 2006 – A Posteriori
- 2008 – Seven Lives Many Faces
- 2016 – The Fall of a Rebel Angel

=== Sandra ===
Cretu worked as writer, producer, and background vocalist on Sandra's albums.

- 1985: The Long Play
- 1986: Mirrors
- 1987: Ten on One
- 1988: Into a Secret Land
- 1988: Everlasting Love
- 1990: Paintings in Yellow
- 1992: Close to Seven
- 1992: 18 Greatest Hits
- 1995: Fading Shades
- 1999: My Favourites
- 2002: The Wheel of Time

=== Collaborations and production ===
- 1980 – Topas – "Topas"
- 1981 – Peter Kent – Happy Weekend
- 1982 – Mireille Mathieu – Ein neuer Morgen
- 1983 – Peter Cornelius – Fata Morgana
- 1984 – Hubert Kah – Goldene Zeiten
- 1986 – Hubert Kah – Tensongs
- 1986 – Avenue – Imagination
- 1985 – Moti Special – Motivation
- 1987 – Mike Oldfield – Islands (co-producer)
- 1987 – Inker & Hamilton – Dancing Into Danger
- 1988 – Cretu & Thiers – Belle Epoque
- 1989 – Hubert Kah – Sound of My Heart
- 1989 – Sylvie Vartan – Confidanses
- 1989 – Peter Schilling – The Different Story (World of Lust and Crime)
- 1992 – Cornelius + Cretu – Cornelius + Cretu
- 1993 – Maggie Reilly – Midnight Sun
- 1996 – Kurt Maloo – The Captain of Her Heart (Michael Cretu Mixes)
- 1998 – Trance Atlantic Air Waves – The Energy of Sound
- 1999 – Andru Donalds – Snowin' Under My Skin
- 2001 – Andru Donalds – Let's Talk About It
- 2007 – Ruth-Ann Boyle – What About Us
