= 1996 in music =

This is a list of notable events in music that occurred in 1996.

== Specific locations ==
- 1996 in British music
- 1996 in Norwegian music
- 1996 in Scandinavian music
- 1996 in South Korean music

== Specific genres ==
- 1996 in classical music
- 1996 in country music
- 1996 in heavy metal music
- 1996 in hip-hop
- 1996 in jazz
- 1996 in Latin music
- 1996 in progressive rock

== Events ==
=== January ===
- January 8 – Robert Hoskins is convicted on five charges of assault, stalking, and threatening to kill Madonna.
- January 16
  - Two American teenagers, Nicholaus McDonald and Brian Bassett, are tried for the murder of Bassett's parents and younger brother. At the trial, defense lawyers attempt to blame the murders on the fact the pair had been listening to "Israel's Son" by Silverchair before the crimes. The murders are dubbed the "Israel's Son Murders". Murmur Records releases an official response, stating that the members of Silverchair do not condone violence of any kind, and that the song "seeks to criticize violence and war by portraying them in all their horror".
  - Jamaican authorities open fire on Jimmy Buffett's seaplane, Hemisphere Dancer, mistaking it for a drug trafficker's plane. U2 singer Bono and Island Records executive Chris Blackwell are also on the plane during the incident. No one is injured.
- January 18 – Lisa Marie Presley files for divorce from Michael Jackson. The two were wed on May 26, 1994.
- January 19–February 4 – The Big Day Out festival takes place in Australia and New Zealand, headlined by Porno for Pyros and Rage Against the Machine.
- January 25 – Madonna receives death threats from Argentine Peronists, who are enraged and insulted that she was playing Eva Peron in Evita. After she arrives in Argentina, over 50 walls throughout the city are spray-painted with the words: ¡Viva Evita! ¡Fuera Madonna! (Long Live Evita! Get Out, Madonna!).
- January 26 – The first public performance of the controversial musical Rent takes place at the New York Theatre Workshop, a day after the death of its creator, Jonathan Larson.
- January 28 – Chris Isaak makes a guest appearance on the television show Friends.
- January 29
  - La Fenice opera house in Venice, Italy, is destroyed by fire.
  - Garth Brooks refuses to accept his American Music Award for Favorite Overall Artist, briefly explaining his belief that all music is "made up of a lot of people".

=== February ===
- February 8 – The Telecommunications Act of 1996 is signed into law in the United States, deregulating the number of radio and TV stations that any one broadcaster can own.
- February 4 – Former Milli Vanilli band member Rob Pilatus is hospitalized after being hit over the head with a baseball bat in Hollywood while attempting to steal a man's car.
- February 13
  - Tupac Shakur releases the first ever rap double album, All Eyez on Me, one of the most influential albums in hip-hop history. All Eyez on Me quickly achieves platinum sales and reaches No. 1 on the Billboard 200 charts.
  - Take That formally announces that they are disbanding.
- February 14 – The artist formerly known as Prince marries backup dancer Mayte Garcia, who is fifteen years his junior.
- February 19 – Jarvis Cocker disrupts a performance by Michael Jackson at the BRIT Awards. During an elaborate staging of "Earth Song", Cocker crashes the stage, lifts his shirt, and points his bottom in Jackson's direction before getting into a scuffle with security. Cocker later states that his actions were "a form of protest at the way Michael Jackson sees himself as some kind of Christ-like figure with the power of healing".
- February 20
  - Sepultura releases their album Roots.
  - Snoop Dogg and his bodyguard are acquitted of first-degree murder. The jury deadlocks on voluntary manslaughter charges, and a mistrial is declared.
  - Storytellers premieres on VH1. The first episode features Ray Davies.
- February 22 – MCA Records buys half of Interscope Records. Time Warner had owned half of Interscope until September 1995, when it sold off its share due to political pressure over the label's gangsta rap artists' explicit lyrics.
- February 28 – The 38th Annual Grammy Awards are presented in Los Angeles, hosted by Ellen DeGeneres. Alanis Morissette wins four awards, including Album of the Year for Jagged Little Pill, while Seal's "Kiss from a Rose" wins both Record of the Year and Song of the Year. Hootie & the Blowfish win Best New Artist. The ceremony also notably features the reunion of the original lineup of Kiss, introduced by Tupac Shakur, for their first appearance in full makeup and outfits since 1979. Frank Sinatra wins the award for Best Traditional Pop Vocal Performance for "Duets II", his first win since 1966.

=== March ===
- March 4 – The Beatles' second reunion song is released as part of their first reunion since the band's breakup 26 years earlier. The song is a finished version of "Real Love", a John Lennon demo from 1980.
- March 13 – Ramones fans riot in Buenos Aires, Argentina after waiting all night for concert tickets, only to find the show is sold out.
- March 16 – Mariah Carey and Boyz II Men's 16th consecutive week stay at No. 1 in the American charts with "One Sweet Day" ends when Celine Dion's "Because You Loved Me" reaches No. 1. "One Sweet Day" enjoyed the longest consecutive stay at No. 1 in the Billboard Hot 100's history.
- March 18 – The Sex Pistols announce they will reunite for a 20th anniversary tour.
- March 28 – Phil Collins announces he is leaving Genesis to focus on his solo career.

=== April ===
- April 1
  - Roberto Alagna marries Angela Gheorghiu backstage at the New York Metropolitan Opera.
  - John Squire announces his departure from The Stone Roses.
- April 3 – M.C. Hammer files for bankruptcy.
- April 4 – The Grateful Dead's Bob Weir and Jerry Garcia's widow, Deborah, scatter part of Garcia's ashes in the Ganges River in India.
- April 10 – Alice in Chains plays at Majestic Theatre in New York City for an MTV unplugged record and video to be released in July.
- April 15 – The remainder of Jerry Garcia's ashes are scattered near the Golden Gate Bridge in San Francisco.
- April 16
  - Madonna announces she is four months pregnant by Carlos Leon, her then-boyfriend and trainer.
  - Rage Against the Machine releases their second studio album, Evil Empire.
- April 17 – Carlo Bergonzi gives his American farewell concert at Carnegie Hall.
- In April 23 - angel bofill release her 10 and final studio album before her stroke in 2006 is love in slow motion, under the label shanachie entertainment Corp, produced by her, andy korn, and rex rideout
- April 24 – This Train, Rick Elias, Jimmy A, Phil Keaggy, Carolyn Arends, Third Day and Ashley Cleveland perform a tribute concert for Rich Mullins at Nashville's Cafe Milano. Speakers include Reunion Records executive Terry Hemmings, record producer Reed Arvin, disc jockey Jon Rivers, and author Brennan Manning.
- April 28 – Oasis play the second of two gigs in Maine Road, home of Manchester City F.C., featured on the video "...There and Then".

=== May ===
- May 8
  - The Galway Early Music Festival is launched in Ireland.
  - A judge rules against Tommy Lee and wife, actress Pamela Anderson Lee, in their attempt to keep Penthouse from publishing still photos taken from an X-rated home movie that was stolen from their home in Los Angeles.
- May 11 – A 17-year-old fan is crushed in the festival seating section at a concert by The Smashing Pumpkins in Dublin, Ireland, despite the presence of 110 security guards and repeated admonishments from the band telling the crowd to stop surging towards the stage. The fan dies of her injuries the next day, and the band cancels that night's show in Belfast as a result.
- May 18 – The 1996 Eurovision Song Contest, held in Oslo Spektrum in Oslo, Norway, is won by Irish singer Eimear Quinn, with the song "The Voice". It is Ireland's record seventh, and most recent, win at Eurovision.
- May 25 – Sublime lead singer Bradley Nowell dies of a heroin overdose at age 28.
- May 30 – Depeche Mode leader Dave Gahan is arrested upon his release from hospital, having overdosed on a heroin and cocaine 'speedball' in a Los Angeles hotel room and been pronounced clinically dead for two minutes in an ambulance. Gahan is ordered by the court to complete a nine-month rehabilitation.

=== June ===
- June 2 – Alice Cooper performs at Sammy Hagar's club, Cabo Wabo, in Mexico. It will be recorded and released, the following year, as a live album.
- June 8 – Tracy Bonham becomes the first female solo artist to reach number one on the Billboard Modern Rock Tracks chart with the single "Mother Mother".
- June 12 – Julia Fischer, the German violinist and pianist, wins the final of the Eurovision Young Musicians 1996 competition in Lisbon, Portugal.
- June 15–16 – San Francisco holds the first Tibetan Freedom Concerts.
- June 19 – Japanese duo Chage and Aska become the first Asian group to participate in MTV Unplugged.
- June 21 – The Sex Pistols start their reunion tour in Lahti, Finland.
- June 25 – Jay-Z releases his debut album Reasonable Doubt.
- June 26 – Sammy Hagar leaves Van Halen.
- June 27 – DJ Screw, creator of chopped and screwed rap and leader of Screwed Up Click, records the 35 minute long June 27 freestyle with Houston rappers Big Moe, Bird, Key-C, Yungstar, Big Pokey, DeMo, Haircut Joe and Kay-Luv.
- June 28 – Kiss kicks off the Alive/Worldwide reunion tour at Tiger Stadium in Detroit, the first tour by the original lineup of the band since 1979.

=== July ===
- July 3
  - This World release their first album since 1986.
  - Alice in Chains perform their last concert with lead singer Layne Staley in Kansas City, Missouri while touring with Kiss.
- July 8 – The Spice Girls release their debut single "Wannabe" in the United Kingdom. The song proved to be a global hit, hitting number 1 in 31 countries and becoming not only the biggest-selling debut single by an all-female group, but also the biggest-selling single by an all-female group of all time.
- July 11 – Robert Simpson's second string quintet receives its première at the Cheltenham International Festival by the Maggini Quartet with Pal Banda, cellist.
- July 13 – Phil Anselmo of Pantera overdoses on heroin after a Texas homecoming gig. Anselmo went into cardiac arrest but was revived after about five minutes by paramedics.
- July 16 – Michael Jackson performs a concert for Hassanal Bolkiah's 50th birthday at the Jerudong Park Amphitheater.
- July 19 – The Proms in the Park event is launched in London, UK.
- July 27 – Adrian Erlandsson & Patrik Jensen form The Haunted.

=== August ===
- August 1 – MTV2 is launched. The first video is "Where It's At" by Beck.
- August 6 – Punk rock group The Ramones play their final show at "The Palace" in Hollywood.
- August 10–11 – Oasis play the largest free-standing gigs in British history at Knebworth House, Stevenage. 2.7 million people apply for tickets and a sold-out crowd of 350,000 attend the concerts; 175,000 each night. Stone Roses guitarist John Squire joins the band onstage to play guitar to Champagne Supernova.
- August 15–16 – Phish hosts The Clifford Ball at Plattsburgh Air Force Base. The event is the first of their festivals, currently totaling ten. 70,000 people show up. Some say the event is considered a precursor to the large-scale music festivals of today.
- August 27 – Aaliyah releases her album One in a Million.

=== September ===
- September 4 – At the MTV Video Music Awards, Van Halen makes a surprise appearance with original singer David Lee Roth.
- September 7
  - Rapper Tupac Shakur is shot several times in a drive-by shooting, while being driven from the MGM Grand Hotel along Sunset Strip in Las Vegas after seeing the Mike Tyson versus Bruce Seldon boxing match. He dies six days later.
  - Michael Jackson starts the HIStory World Tour.
- September 10 – Wal-Mart announces it will not carry Sheryl Crow's upcoming self-titled album, because of the lyric "Watch out, sister, watch out, brother/watch our children while they kill each other/with a gun they bought at Wal-Mart Discount Stores."
- September 11 – David Bowie's single "Telling Lies" becomes the first song offered as a digital single by a major record label (Virgin Records). Bowie launches the single by hosting an online chat in which he and two other people pretending to be him answer questions from the audience; Bowie tells the truth, while the other two are "telling lies".
- September 12 – Controversy follows The Eagles when the band dedicates "Peaceful Easy Feeling" to Saddam Hussein at a United States Democratic Party fundraiser held in Los Angeles.
- September 12 — Ricardo López mails Icelandic singer Björk a device disguised as a book designed to spray sulfuric acid on her face with the goal of disfiguring or killing her, before shooting and killing himself on camera in his apartment in Hollywood, Florida. His body is found on September 16, and subsequently the device is intercepted by Scotland Yard before it can reach Björk.
- September 13 – Tupac Shakur dies as a result of injuries sustained six days earlier.
- September 17 — Tool releases their second album Ænima.
- September 21 – Meg White marries John Anthony Gillis, who changes his name to Jack White. They will form The White Stripes the following year.
- September 24 – Weezer releases its second record, Pinkerton. Its darker vibe, and departure from their earlier style, mean it sells less well and is critically panned upon its release. However, it later garners a cult following and is eventually considered among the band's best work.
- September 27 – Sasha and Digweed release Northern Exposure, which has gone on to be considered one of the greatest dance albums of all time.

=== October ===
- October 4
  - Eddie and Alex Van Halen announce David Lee Roth will not be continuing as lead singer of Van Halen and Gary Cherone will be the band's next vocalist.
  - C-Block releases the single "So Strung Out", which reaches the fourth chart position in Germany.
- October 5 — Alternative metal band Deftones incite a riot at KUPD's U-Fest at Desert Sky Pavilion (now known as Talking Stick Resort Amphitheatre) incited by lead singer Chino Moreno due to rumors that he and other members were intoxicated before their set due to their discovery of the death of Dana Wells, the late stepson of Max Cavalera. This also resulted in the band having a physical altercation with the gothic metal band Type O Negative at The Purgatory, a former Phoenix local bar after the concert due to them not being able to perform as the 10th and final set of U-Fest after the Deftones set due to the excessive rioting.
- October 6 – Country singers Tim McGraw and Faith Hill marry.

October 8 1996 - ginuwine releases his debut album, the bachelor, singles like pony,tell me do you wanna,holler,only when your lonely,hello,lonely daze, ginuwine 4 your mind,I'll do anything/ I'm sorry,the world is so cold,and g thang

- October 13 – Prince's son Gregory Nelson dies from Pfeiffer Syndrome.
- October 14 – Madonna gives birth to daughter Lourdes Maria Ciccone Leon.
- October 15 – Korn's second studio album, Life Is Peachy, debuts at number 3 on the Billboard 200 and goes on to sell 6 million copies worldwide.
- October 27 – Pop-Up Video receives its première on VH1.
- October 28 – MTV India launches.
- October 29
  - Slash announces, in a faxed statement, he is officially leaving Guns N' Roses.
  - Ian Brown and Mani officially dissolve The Stone Roses.
- October 31 – David Brookes is fined £45 in Hampstead Magistrates' Court for disrupting the "quiet enjoyment" of the public by playing his bagpipes on Hampstead Heath. Described as "a pain in the neck" by a spokesperson for the College of Pipers in Glasgow, Brookes vows to buy a bicycle to continue playing in the open air, so "they'll just have to catch me." He says he has been piping on the heath for twenty years and has been given permission to do so, adding he's surprised by the ruling because social workers are allowed to distribute condoms there.

=== November ===
November 5 - even after his passing in September 13,1996, tupac and the outlawz posthumously released his 5th and final studio album under the name makeveli the don killuminati, the 7 day theory.

- November 8 – After its première at the Sundance Film Festival in January, the film Hype!, a documentary on the Seattle grunge scene, opens to general audiences.
- November 12 – Eminem releases his debut studio album Infinite.
- November 24 – Crowded House play their farewell concert on the steps of the Sydney Opera House in Australia, in front of an audience of almost 200,000. Proceeds support the Sydney Children's Hospital. The band will reunite a decade later with a new studio album and tour.

=== December ===
- December 7 – The Sex Pistols finish their reunion tour in Santiago, Chile.
- December 14 – The 25th OTI Festival, held at the Teatro Nacional of the Casa de la Cultura Ecuatoriana in Quito, Ecuador, is won by the song "Manos", written by Chema Purón and Eduardo Leiva, and performed by Anabel Russ representing Spain.
- December 16 – Max Cavalera leaves Sepultura. Speculation for his departure includes claims that he was upset that the band did not renew his wife Gloria's contract as manager, as well as for being overwhelmed by the death of his stepson. Cavalera later denies those theories and says he left the band simply because the members had grown apart.
- December 31 – The twenty-fifth annual New Year's Rockin' Eve special airs on ABC, with appearances by Shawn Colvin, KC & the Sunshine Band, Spice Girls, Squirrel Nut Zippers and Usher.

=== Also in 1996 ===
- Jesper Strömblad leaves Hammerfall.
- House of Pain break up; this will lead to DJ Lethal joining Limp Bizkit.
- The Monkees embark on their 30th Anniversary Reunion Tour.
- Singer Tori Amos is sued when a man crashes his car after being distracted by a billboard advertising her album. The billboard featured a photo of Amos breastfeeding a piglet.
- Coal Chamber signs with Roadrunner Records and Mikey "Bug" Cox replaces John Tor.

== Bands formed ==
- See Musical groups established in 1996

== Bands disbanded ==
- See Musical groups disestablished in 1996

== Bands on hiatus ==
- Black Sabbath

== Bands reunited ==
- The Monkees
- New Edition
- Poison
- Kiss
- Devo
- Supertramp
- Patti Smith

== Albums released ==
=== January–March ===
| Date | | Album | Artist | Notes |
|---|---|---|---|---|
| J A N U A R Y | 1 | Cut in Half and Also Double | Emily Haines | - |
| J A N U A R Y | 1 | Inquilaab | Junoon | - |
| J A N U A R Y | 1 | Splay | Shiner | - |
| J A N U A R Y | 2 | Grom | Behemoth | - |
| J A N U A R Y | 9 | Victor | Alex Lifeson | - |
| J A N U A R Y | 9 | Early Mornin' Stoned Pimp | Kid Rock | - |
| J A N U A R Y | 9 | Right in the Middle of It | Chely Wright | - |
| J A N U A R Y | 9 | Star Maps | Possum Dixon | - |
| J A N U A R Y | 9 | Young, Rich & Dangerous | Kris Kross | - |
| J A N U A R Y | 12 | Expecting to Fly | The Bluetones | - |
| J A N U A R Y | 12 | Music of My Life | Jo Stafford | - |
| J A N U A R Y | 15 | Loops of Fury | The Chemical Brothers | EP |
| J A N U A R Y | 15 | Predator | Accept | - |
| J A N U A R Y | 15 | Total Death | Darkthrone | - |
| J A N U A R Y | 16 | El Producto | Walt Mink | - |
| J A N U A R Y | 16 | Viva! La Woman | Cibo Matto | - |
| J A N U A R Y | 16 | Words | Tony Rich | - |
| J A N U A R Y | 19 | Painting on Glass | The 3rd and the Mortal | - |
| J A N U A R Y | 22 | The Cult of Ray | Frank Black | - |
| J A N U A R Y | 23 | Boys for Pele | Tori Amos | - |
| J A N U A R Y | 23 | Wither Blister Burn & Peel | Stabbing Westward | - |
| J A N U A R Y | 23 | 10 Speed | Mystery Machine | - |
| J A N U A R Y | 23 | Helter Skelter | The D.O.C. | - |
| J A N U A R Y | 23 | The Trouble with the Truth | Patty Loveless | - |
| J A N U A R Y | 25 | Hey Man | Mr. Big | Japan |
| J A N U A R Y | 25 | Stormblåst | Dimmu Borgir | - |
| J A N U A R Y | 26 | Horsedrawn Wishes | Rollerskate Skinny | - |
| J A N U A R Y | 26 | Maniacal Laughter | The Bouncing Souls | - |
| J A N U A R Y | 29 | Advance | LFO | |
| J A N U A R Y | 30 | Millions Now Living Will Never Die | Tortoise | - |
| J A N U A R Y | 30 | Beautiful Girls | Various Artists | Soundtrack |
| J A N U A R Y | 30 | Diatribes | Napalm Death | - |
| J A N U A R Y | 30 | Don't Be a Menace to South Central While Drinking Your Juice in the Hood | Various Artists | Soundtrack |
| J A N U A R Y | 30 | Filth Pig | Ministry | - |
| J A N U A R Y | 30 | How I Quit Smoking | Lambchop | - |
| J A N U A R Y | 30 | Str8 off tha Streetz of Muthaphukkin Compton | Eazy-E | - |
| J A N U A R Y | 30 | Total | Total | - |
| J A N U A R Y | 31 | Filosofem | Burzum | - |
| J A N U A R Y | 31 | Heavy Petting Zoo | NOFX | - |
| J A N U A R Y | ? | The Secrets of the Black Arts | Dark Funeral | Debut |
| F E B R U A R Y | 5 | Purpendicular | Deep Purple | - |
| F E B R U A R Y | 5 | Don't Stop | Status Quo | - |
| F E B R U A R Y | 5 | Free Spirit | Bonnie Tyler | - |
| F E B R U A R Y | 6 | The Heart Speaks | Terence Blanchard | - |
| F E B R U A R Y | 6 | Kids on the Street | Cherry Poppin' Daddies | - |
| F E B R U A R Y | 6 | Sackcloth 'n' Ashes | 16 Horsepower | - |
| F E B R U A R Y | 6 | Tennessee Moon | Neil Diamond | - |
| F E B R U A R Y | 7 | Beat Out! | Glay | - |
| F E B R U A R Y | 13 | All Eyez on Me | 2Pac | 2x CD |
| F E B R U A R Y | 13 | Congratulations I'm Sorry | Gin Blossoms | - |
| F E B R U A R Y | 13 | Here in After | Immolation | - |
| F E B R U A R Y | 13 | Looking East | Jackson Browne | - |
| F E B R U A R Y | 13 | The Score | Fugees | - |
| F E B R U A R Y | 13 | What the Hell Happened to Me? | Adam Sandler | - |
| F E B R U A R Y | 19 | Skunkworks | Bruce Dickinson | - |
| F E B R U A R Y | 20 | Affliction | Econoline Crush | - |
| F E B R U A R Y | 20 | The Awakening | Lord Finesse | - |
| F E B R U A R Y | 20 | Bloom | Audio Adrenaline | - |
| F E B R U A R Y | 20 | Come Find Yourself | Fun Lovin' Criminals | Debut |
| F E B R U A R Y | 20 | Firewater | Silkworm | - |
| F E B R U A R Y | 20 | The Jester Race | In Flames | - |
| F E B R U A R Y | 20 | Murder Ballads | Nick Cave and the Bad Seeds | - |
| F E B R U A R Y | 20 | Pies Descalzos | Shakira | - |
| F E B R U A R Y | 20 | Roots | Sepultura | - |
| F E B R U A R Y | 20 | Set the Twilight Reeling | Lou Reed | - |
| F E B R U A R Y | 20 | Take Me to Your Leader | Newsboys | - |
| F E B R U A R Y | 20 | What I Live to Do | James Bonamy | - |
| F E B R U A R Y | 23 | Our Band Could Be Your Life: A Tribute to D Boon and the Minutemen | Various Artists | Tribute to Minutemen |
| F E B R U A R Y | 26 | The Mission | Captain Jack | - |
| F E B R U A R Y | 27 | Dead Man | Neil Young | Soundtrack |
| F E B R U A R Y | 27 | Fizzy Fuzzy Big & Buzzy | The Refreshments | - |
| F E B R U A R Y | 27 | Goldfinger | Goldfinger | Debut |
| F E B R U A R Y | 27 | The Gray Race | Bad Religion | - |
| F E B R U A R Y | 27 | Heartbreak Town | Steve Azar | - |
| F E B R U A R Y | 27 | High on the Hog | The Band | - |
| F E B R U A R Y | 27 | Lay It Down | Cowboy Junkies | - |
| F E B R U A R Y | 27 | Peach Fuzz | Enuff Z'Nuff | US |
| F E B R U A R Y | 27 | Pogue Mahone | The Pogues | - |
| F E B R U A R Y | 27 | The Process | Skinny Puppy | - |
| F E B R U A R Y | 27 | The Speed of Cattle | Archers of Loaf | Compilation |
| F E B R U A R Y | 27 | Static Age | Misfits | - |
| M A R C H | 4 | Mercury Falling | Sting | - |
| M A R C H | 4 | Hits | Mike + The Mechanics | Compilation |
| M A R C H | 4 | After Murder Park | The Auteurs | - |
| M A R C H | 4 | Myra Lee | Cat Power | - |
| M A R C H | 5 | Gravity Kills | Gravity Kills | - |
| M A R C H | 5 | House of GVSB | Girls Against Boys | - |
| M A R C H | 5 | I Feel Alright | Steve Earle | - |
| M A R C H | 5 | Lovelife | Lush | - |
| M A R C H | 5 | Naughty Little Doggie | Iggy Pop | - |
| M A R C H | 5 | Offbeat: A Red Hot Soundtrip | Various Artists | Red Hot AIDS benefit |
| M A R C H | 5 | The Time of the Oath | Helloween | US |
| M A R C H | 11 | Arena | Asia | - |
| M A R C H | 11 | Beat the Bastards | The Exploited | - |
| M A R C H | 11 | Refresh the Demon | Annihilator | - |
| M A R C H | 11 | Regular Urban Survivors | Terrorvision | - |
| M A R C H | 11 | Tarantula | Ride | - |
| M A R C H | 11 | Thomas Wade & Wayward | Thomas Wade & Wayward | - |
| M A R C H | 12 | All Scratched Up! | Down by Law | - |
| M A R C H | 12 | Bad Hair Day | "Weird Al" Yankovic | - |
| M A R C H | 12 | Black Love | The Afghan Whigs | - |
| M A R C H | 12 | Falling into You | Celine Dion | US |
| M A R C H | 12 | Gato Negro | 7 Year Bitch | - |
| M A R C H | 12 | Gilded Stars and Zealous Hearts | Velocity Girl | - |
| M A R C H | 12 | Kiss Unplugged | Kiss | Live |
| M A R C H | 12 | Start Packing | Run On | - |
| M A R C H | 12 | Surrender to the Air | Surrender to the Air | - |
| M A R C H | 18 | Emperor Tomato Ketchup | Stereolab | - |
| M A R C H | 18 | Another Way to Shine | Spiritual Beggars | - |
| M A R C H | 18 | The Beatles Anthology, Volume 2 | The Beatles | Compilation +1 new track |
| M A R C H | 18 | Karate | Karate | - |
| M A R C H | 19 | Born on a Pirate Ship | Barenaked Ladies | - |
| M A R C H | 19 | The Burdens of Being Upright | Tracy Bonham | Debut |
| M A R C H | 19 | Colossal Head | Los Lobos | - |
| M A R C H | 19 | Fifa | Angélique Kidjo | - |
| M A R C H | 19 | Gently | Liza Minnelli | - |
| M A R C H | 19 | Girl 6 | Prince | Soundtrack |
| M A R C H | 19 | Kollage | Bahamadia | - |
| M A R C H | 19 | No. 2 Live Dinner | Robert Earl Keen | Live |
| M A R C H | 19 | Off Parole | Rappin' 4-Tay | - |
| M A R C H | 19 | The Resurrection | Geto Boys | - |
| M A R C H | 19 | Second Toughest in the Infants | Underworld | - |
| M A R C H | 19 | Songs in the Key of X: Music from and Inspired by the X-Files | Various Artists | Soundtrack to The X-Files TV series |
| M A R C H | 23 | Holy Land | Angra | – |
| M A R C H | 25 | Greatest Hits | Take That | Compilation |
| M A R C H | 25 | Golden Heart | Mark Knopfler | - |
| M A R C H | 25 | Made Again | Marillion | 2x CD; Live |
| M A R C H | 25 | Call the Doctor | Sleater-Kinney | - |
| M A R C H | 25 | Now That's What I Call Music! 33 (UK series) | Various Artists | Compilation |
| M A R C H | 26 | 40 More Reasons to Hate Us | Anal Cunt | - |
| M A R C H | 26 | The Coming | Busta Rhymes | Solo Debut |
| M A R C H | 26 | Deathshead Extermination | Crisis | - |
| M A R C H | 26 | Hissing Prigs in Static Couture | Brainiac | - |
| M A R C H | 26 | Jo Dee Messina | Jo Dee Messina | - |
| M A R C H | 26 | On Avery Island | Neutral Milk Hotel | - |
| M A R C H | 26 | Regretfully Yours | Superdrag | - |
| M A R C H | 26 | Tiny Music... Songs from the Vatican Gift Shop | Stone Temple Pilots | - |
| M A R C H | 26 | Under the Bushes Under the Stars | Guided by Voices | - |
| M A R C H | 26 | Villains | The Verve Pipe | - |
| M A R C H | ? | Kveldssanger | Ulver | - |
| M A R C H | ? | Welcome to the Infant Freebase | The Soundtrack of Our Lives | Debut |

=== April–June ===
| Date | | Album | Artist | Notes |
|---|---|---|---|---|
| A P R I L | 1 | Wildest Dreams | Tina Turner | Europe |
| A P R I L | 1 | A Maximum High | Shed Seven | UK |
| A P R I L | 1 | Democracy | Killing Joke | UK |
| A P R I L | 2 | 10 Song Demo | Rosanne Cash | - |
| A P R I L | 2 | Count the Days | Citizen King | EP |
| A P R I L | 2 | The In Sound from Way Out! | Beastie Boys | - |
| A P R I L | 2 | Crimson | Edge of Sanity | - |
| A P R I L | 2 | Dopesick | Eyehategod | - |
| A P R I L | 2 | The Golden Age | Cracker | - |
| A P R I L | 2 | Maxwell's Urban Hang Suite | Maxwell | Debut |
| A P R I L | 2 | Oz Factor | Unwritten Law | - |
| A P R I L | 2 | Songs of a Dead Dreamer | DJ Spooky | Debut |
| A P R I L | 5 | Reject All American | Bikini Kill | - |
| A P R I L | 5 | Sorrow Throughout the Nine Worlds | Amon Amarth | EP |
| A P R I L | 8 | Moseley Shoals | Ocean Colour Scene | Debut |
| A P R I L | 9 | Repetition | Unwound | - |
| A P R I L | 9 | Death Threatz | MC Eiht | - |
| A P R I L | 9 | The Great Divide | Semisonic | - |
| A P R I L | 9 | Here to Save You All | Chino XL | - |
| A P R I L | 9 | Revival | Gillian Welch | Debut |
| A P R I L | 9 | Schoolhouse Rock! Rocks | Various Artists | Tribute |
| A P R I L | 9 | The Villain in Black | MC Ren | - |
| A P R I L | 15 | Number Two Express | Christian McBride | - |
| A P R I L | 15 | Reverence | Faithless | Debut |
| A P R I L | 15 | Today's Specials | The Specials | Covers album |
| A P R I L | 15 | Milk & Kisses | Cocteau Twins | UK |
| A P R I L | 16 | Evil Empire | Rage Against the Machine | - |
| A P R I L | 16 | The Forgotten Tales | Blind Guardian | Compilation |
| A P R I L | 16 | As Good as Dead | Local H | - |
| A P R I L | 16 | Blow It Out Your Ass It's Veruca Salt | Veruca Salt | EP |
| A P R I L | 16 | Blue Moon | Toby Keith | - |
| A P R I L | 16 | Borderline | Brooks & Dunn | - |
| A P R I L | 16 | Farewell | Oingo Boingo | - |
| A P R I L | 16 | Ice Cream Man | Master P | - |
| A P R I L | 16 | Make Your Mama Proud | Fastball | - |
| A P R I L | 16 | Sell, Sell, Sell | David Gray | - |
| A P R I L | 16 | Shot | The Jesus Lizard | - |
| A P R I L | 16 | This Is a Long Drive for Someone with Nothing to Think About | Modest Mouse | Debut |
| A P R I L | 16 | You? Me? Us? | Richard Thompson | - |
| A P R I L | 18 | Destroy All Monsters/Live in Japan | Raven | Live |
| A P R I L | 22 | Episode | Stratovarius | - |
| A P R I L | 22 | Return of the Mack | Mark Morrison | - |
| A P R I L | 22 | Style | Luna Sea | - |
| A P R I L | 23 | Blue Clear Sky | George Strait | - |
| A P R I L | 23 | Fairweather Johnson | Hootie & the Blowfish | - |
| A P R I L | 23 | Guitar Slinger | The Brian Setzer Orchestra | - |
| A P R I L | 23 | Just Fred | Fred Schneider | - |
| A P R I L | 23 | Less Talk, More Rock | Propagandhi | - |
| A P R I L | 23 | New Beginning | SWV | - |
| A P R I L | 23 | Sacred Cow | Geggy Tah | - |
| A P R I L | 23 | Through Silver in Blood | Neurosis | - |
| A P R I L | 23 | Telephono | Spoon | - |
| A P R I L | 29 | To the Faithful Departed | The Cranberries | - |
| A P R I L | 29 | Arise Therefore | Palace Music | - |
| A P R I L | 29 | Casanova | The Divine Comedy | - |
| A P R I L | 29 | Goosefair | China Drum | Debut |
| A P R I L | 29 | In Sides | Orbital | - |
| A P R I L | 29 | Louder Than Hell | Manowar | - |
| A P R I L | 29 | Love Your Self Abuse | Baby Chaos | - |
| A P R I L | 29 | Nearly God | Tricky | - |
| A P R I L | 29 | Klassics with a "K" | Kostars | - |
| A P R I L | 30 | After the Satellite Sings | Bill Nelson | - |
| A P R I L | 30 | Az Yet | Az Yet | Debut |
| A P R I L | 30 | Bob Mould | Bob Mould | |
| A P R I L | 30 | Crash | Dave Matthews Band | - |
| A P R I L | 30 | The Day of the Robot | Buckethead | - |
| A P R I L | 30 | Do You Know Who You Are? | Texas Is the Reason | - |
| A P R I L | 30 | I Shot Andy Warhol | Various Artists | Soundtrack |
| A P R I L | 30 | Ten Thousand Angels | Mindy McCready | - |
| A P R I L | 30 | Eventually | Paul Westerberg | - |
| A P R I L | ? | The Known Universe | Ass Ponys | - |
| A P R I L | ? | They Spent Their Wild Youthful Days in the Glittering World of the Salons | Swirlies | - |
| A P R I L | ? | Tin Cans with Strings to You | Far | - |
| A P R I L | ? | Wake Up Jeff! | The Wiggles | - |
| M A Y | 1 | 7 | Apoptygma Berzerk | - |
| M A Y | 1 | Ass Cobra | Turbonegro | - |
| M A Y | 6 | Wild Mood Swings | The Cure | - |
| M A Y | 6 | 1977 | Ash | - |
| M A Y | 6 | Backstreet Boys | Backstreet Boys | Debut; Europe only |
| M A Y | 6 | Electriclarryland | Butthole Surfers | - |
| M A Y | 6 | The It Girl | Sleeper | - |
| M A Y | 6 | Walking Wounded | Everything but the Girl | - |
| M A Y | 7 | Dr. Octagonecologyst | Dr. Octagon | Alias used by Kool Keith |
| M A Y | 7 | The Great Southern Trendkill | Pantera | - |
| M A Y | 7 | Imperial Drag | Imperial Drag | - |
| M A Y | 7 | Infotainment? | Pitchshifter | - |
| M A Y | 7 | Now in a Minute | Donna Lewis | Debut |
| M A Y | 7 | Seasick | Imperial Teen | Debut |
| M A Y | 7 | Teri Yakimoto | Guttermouth | - |
| M A Y | 7 | Trouble at the Henhouse | The Tragically Hip | - |
| M A Y | 7 | Twister: Music from the Motion Picture Soundtrack | Various Artists | Soundtrack |
| M A Y | 13 | Older | George Michael | - |
| M A Y | 13 | Slang | Def Leppard | - |
| M A Y | 13 | Too Much Too Young: The Gold Collection | The Specials | Compilation |
| M A Y | 14 | All Set | Buzzcocks | - |
| M A Y | 14 | All This Useless Beauty | Elvis Costello & The Attractions | - |
| M A Y | 14 | Elegy | Amorphis | - |
| M A Y | 14 | Amazing Disgrace | The Posies | - |
| M A Y | 14 | Long Line | Peter Wolf | - |
| M A Y | 14 | Looking in the Shadows | The Raincoats | - |
| M A Y | 14 | Now & Forever | Color Me Badd | - |
| M A Y | 14 | Milk and Scissors | The Handsome Family | - |
| M A Y | 14 | Rude Awakening | Prong | - |
| M A Y | 14 | You've Got to Believe in Something | Spin Doctors | - |
| M A Y | 15 | Curb | Nickelback | Debut |
| M A Y | 15 | The Cleanest War | Morning Again | Debut EP |
| M A Y | 20 | The Beautiful Game | Various artists | - |
| M A Y | 20 | Duncan Sheik | Duncan Sheik | - |
| M A Y | 20 | Ear Candy | King's X | - |
| M A Y | 20 | Everything Must Go | Manic Street Preachers | - |
| M A Y | 20 | Fuzzy Logic | Super Furry Animals | Debut |
| M A Y | 20 | Joy (Within)! | William Hooker and Billy Bang | Live |
| M A Y | 20 | Love in Space | Hawkwind | Live |
| M A Y | 20 | Prozaic | Honeycrack | Debut |
| M A Y | 21 | Bringing Down the Horse | The Wallflowers | - |
| M A Y | 21 | Chim Chim's Badass Revenge | Fishbone | - |
| M A Y | 21 | Destruction by Definition | The Suicide Machines | Debut |
| M A Y | 21 | Dilate | Ani DiFranco | - |
| M A Y | 21 | Down on the Upside | Soundgarden | - |
| M A Y | 21 | Gettin' It | Too Short | - |
| M A Y | 21 | Immortal (Beth Hart album) | Beth Hart Band | Debut |
| M A Y | 21 | Let It Rock | Great White | - |
| M A Y | 21 | Near-Life Experience | Come | - |
| M A Y | 21 | Perspective | Jason Becker | - |
| M A Y | 21 | Pure Instinct | Scorpions | - |
| M A Y | 21 | Rubbing Doesn't Help | Magnapop | - |
| M A Y | 21 | Steel on a Mission | Lil' ½ Dead | - |
| M A Y | 21 | Vile | Cannibal Corpse | - |
| M A Y | 22 | Live at the Budokan | Blur | Japan |
| M A Y | 25 | Retropolis | The Flower Kings | - |
| M A Y | 25 | Roomic Cube | Takako Minekawa | - |
| M A Y | 27 | Blood on Ice | Bathory | - |
| M A Y | 27 | The Future Is Medium | Compulsion | - |
| M A Y | 27 | Gabrielle | Gabrielle | - |
| M A Y | 28 | Good God's Urge | Porno for Pyros | - |
| M A Y | 28 | High Lonesome Sound | Vince Gill | - |
| M A Y | 28 | Infliction | Scheer | - |
| M A Y | 28 | Miracle | Puff Johnson | - |
| M A Y | 28 | Take It from the Man! | The Brian Jonestown Massacre | - |
| M A Y | 28 | Undisputed Attitude | Slayer | - |
| M A Y | 29 | Fake Star ~I'm Just a Japanese Fake Rocker~ | Kuroyume | - |
| J U N E | 1 | Oh Lord! When? How? | The Hives | Debut EP |
| J U N E | 1 | Supershitty to the Max! | The Hellacopters | Debut |
| J U N E | 3 | Love Brace | Tomomi Kahara | - |
| J U N E | 3 | Feed Me Weird Things | Squarepusher | Debut |
| J U N E | 3 | Romeo's Heart | John Farnham | - |
| J U N E | 3 | Spiritchaser | Dead Can Dance | - |
| J U N E | 4 | 18 til I Die | Bryan Adams | - |
| J U N E | 4 | Banana Wind | Jimmy Buffett | - |
| J U N E | 4 | Copperopolis | Grant Lee Buffalo | - |
| J U N E | 4 | Delinquent Habits | Delinquent Habits | Debut |
| J U N E | 4 | Destiny | Gloria Estefan | US |
| J U N E | 4 | Dimestore Hoods | Dimestore Hoods | US |
| J U N E | 4 | Future Rhythm | Digital Underground | - |
| J U N E | 4 | Hot | Squirrel Nut Zippers | - |
| J U N E | 4 | Ice-T VI: Return of the Real | Ice-T | - |
| J U N E | 4 | Legal Drug Money | Lost Boyz | Debut |
| J U N E | 4 | Load | Metallica | - |
| J U N E | 4 | Me and You | Kenny Chesney | - |
| J U N E | 4 | My Heart | Donell Jones | - |
| J U N E | 4 | Revival | Core | US |
| J U N E | 4 | Somebody New | Rhett Akins | - |
| J U N E | 4 | Spirit | Willie Nelson | - |
| J U N E | 4 | Subliminal Sandwich | Meat Beat Manifesto | |
| J U N E | 5 | Horror Wrestling | Drain STH | Debut |
| J U N E | 6 | Tigermilk | Belle & Sebastian | Debut |
| J U N E | 7 | Dreamland | Robert Miles | Debut |
| J U N E | 10 | The Light User Syndrome | The Fall | - |
| J U N E | 10 | Peace at Last | The Blue Nile | - |
| J U N E | 10 | Swansong | Carcass | - |
| J U N E | 11 | L. Ron | Barkmarket | - |
| J U N E | 11 | Physical Funk | Domino | - |
| J U N E | 11 | Sacrebleu | Dimitri from Paris | Debut |
| J U N E | 11 | T.A.P.O.A.F.O.M. | George Clinton and the P-Funk All Stars | - |
| J U N E | 12 | One Chord to Another | Sloan | Canada |
| J U N E | 17 | Don Solaris | 808 State | - |
| J U N E | 17 | Free Peace Sweet | Dodgy | - |
| J U N E | 17 | Macarena Non Stop | Los del Río | Compilation |
| J U N E | 17 | Placebo | Placebo | Debut |
| J U N E | 17 | Upgrade & Afterlife | Gastr del Sol | - |
| J U N E | 18 | A Ass Pocket of Whiskey | R. L. Burnside and The Jon Spencer Blues Explosion | - |
| J U N E | 18 | Book of Shadows | Zakk Wylde | - |
| J U N E | 18 | Gone Again | Patti Smith | - |
| J U N E | 18 | High/Low | Nada Surf | Debut |
| J U N E | 18 | Just Like You | Keb' Mo' | - |
| J U N E | 18 | Live from Neon Park | Little Feat | Live |
| J U N E | 18 | Nocturnal | Heltah Skeltah | Debut |
| J U N E | 18 | Odelay | Beck | - |
| J U N E | 18 | The Patti Smith Masters | Patti Smith | Box set |
| J U N E | 18 | The Road to Ensenada | Lyle Lovett | - |
| J U N E | 18 | Rocket | Primitive Radio Gods | - |
| J U N E | 18 | Secrets | Toni Braxton | - |
| J U N E | 18 | Somewhere Inside | Chris Cummings | - |
| J U N E | 18 | Teknowhore | Bile | - |
| J U N E | 18 | Their Satanic Majesties' Second Request | The Brian Jonestown Massacre | - |
| J U N E | 18 | Third Day | Third Day | - |
| J U N E | 18 | Very Proud of Ya | AFI | - |
| J U N E | 24 | Morningrise | Opeth | Europe |
| J U N E | 25 | America Is Dying Slowly | Various Artists | Red Hot AIDS benefit |
| J U N E | 25 | Back To The World | Tevin Campbell | - |
| J U N E | 25 | Braver Newer World | Jimmie Dale Gilmore | - |
| J U N E | 25 | Dust | Screaming Trees | - |
| J U N E | 25 | Get On Up and Dance | Quad City DJ's | - |
| J U N E | 25 | H_{2}O | H_{2}O | Debut |
| J U N E | 25 | Peace Beyond Passion | Me'shell Ndegeocello | - |
| J U N E | 25 | Psychoanalysis: What Is It? | Prince Paul | Debut |
| J U N E | 25 | Ranetoe Serdce (Broken Heart) | Lyapis Trubetskoy | - |
| J U N E | 25 | Reasonable Doubt | Jay-Z | Debut |
| J U N E | 25 | Xtort | KMFDM | - |
| J U N E | 25 | You Wanted the Best, You Got the Best!! | Kiss | Live |
| J U N E | 26 | Vibe∞ | Penicillin | - |
| J U N E | 27 | The Power of Sex | E-Rotic | - |
| J U N E | ? | Bis vs. the D.I.Y. Corps | Bis | - |

=== July–September ===
| Date | | Album | Artist | Notes |
|---|---|---|---|---|
| J U L Y | 2 | Broken Arrow | Neil Young and Crazy Horse | - |
| J U L Y | 2 | The Final Tic | Crucial Conflict | - |
| J U L Y | 2 | It Was Written | Nas | - |
| J U L Y | 2 | It's Martini Time | The Reverend Horton Heat | - |
| J U L Y | 2 | Jawbox | Jawbox | - |
| J U L Y | 2 | Live from the Fall | Blues Traveler | Live |
| J U L Y | 2 | Stakes Is High | De La Soul | - |
| J U L Y | 2 | Wax Ecstatic | Sponge | - |
| J U L Y | 3 | None So Vile | Cryptopsy | - |
| J U L Y | 7 | Destroy What Destroys You | Against All Authority | Debut |
| J U L Y | 8 | Today Is Another Day | Zard | - |
| J U L Y | 9 | Blue | LeAnn Rimes | - |
| J U L Y | 9 | Building the Bridge | REO Speedwagon | - |
| J U L Y | 9 | Chaos and Disorder | Prince | - |
| J U L Y | 9 | Irresistible Bliss | Soul Coughing | - |
| J U L Y | 9 | Scenery and Fish | I Mother Earth | - |
| J U L Y | 15 | Shape | Frente! | - |
| J U L Y | 15 | It Ain't 4 Play | Funk Mobb | - |
| J U L Y | 15 | The Quickening | The Vandals | - |
| J U L Y | 15 | Wild Cowboys | Sadat X | Debut |
| J U L Y | 16 | Stag | Melvins | - |
| J U L Y | 16 | 12 Golden Country Greats | Ween | - |
| J U L Y | 16 | Lemon Parade | Tonic | - |
| J U L Y | 16 | No Lunch | D Generation | - |
| J U L Y | 16 | Outpost | The Samples | - |
| J U L Y | 20 | Sweet 19 Blues | Namie Amuro | Debut solo album |
| J U L Y | 22 | Technicolour | Disco Inferno | - |
| J U L Y | 23 | Demo Evergreen Terrace 1996 | Evergreen Terrace | EP |
| J U L Y | 23 | The Dark Saga | Iced Earth | - |
| J U L Y | 23 | Miracle of Science | Marshall Crenshaw | - |
| J U L Y | 23 | Return of the Frog Queen | Jeremy Enigk | - |
| J U L Y | 23 | Songs for a Blue Guitar | Red House Painters | - |
| J U L Y | 23 | Static Prevails | Jimmy Eat World | - |
| J U L Y | 23 | Three Snakes and One Charm | The Black Crowes | - |
| J U L Y | 23 | Tidal | Fiona Apple | - |
| J U L Y | 23 | Tragic | Orange 9mm | - |
| J U L Y | 29 | The Crow: City of Angels | Various Artists | Soundtrack |
| J U L Y | 29 | Drum 'n' Bass for Papa | Plug | - |
| J U L Y | 29 | Irreligious | Moonspell | - |
| J U L Y | 29 | A New Stereophonic Sound Spectacular | Hooverphonic | Belgium |
| J U L Y | 30 | Beats, Rhymes and Life | A Tribe Called Quest | - |
| J U L Y | 30 | Mista | Mista | - |
| J U L Y | 30 | Republica | Republica | - |
| J U L Y | 30 | Songs | Rich Mullins | Compilation |
| J U L Y | 30 | Sublime | Sublime | - |
| J U L Y | 30 | Unplugged | Alice in Chains | Live |
| J U L Y | ? | Not So Tough Now | Frenzal Rhomb | - |
| J U L Y | ? | Rockin' down the Highway: The Wildlife Concert | The Doobie Brothers | Live |
| J U L Y | ? | This World | This World | - |
| A U G U S T | 1 | Brave Murder Day | Katatonia | - |
| A U G U S T | 1 | Ravendusk in My Heart | Diabolical Masquerade | - |
| A U G U S T | 6 | Anne Murray | Anne Murray | - |
| A U G U S T | 6 | Interstate 8 | Modest Mouse | EP |
| A U G U S T | 6 | Music from the Unrealized Film Script: Dusk at Cubist Castle | The Olivia Tremor Control | - |
| A U G U S T | 6 | No End of Love | John Hartford | - |
| A U G U S T | 6 | Oedipus Schmoedipus | Barry Adamson | - |
| A U G U S T | 6 | Paranormalized | Six Finger Satellite | - |
| A U G U S T | 6 | Shake a Lil' Somethin' | 2 Live Crew | - |
| A U G U S T | 6 | Songs and Music from "She's the One" | Tom Petty and the Heartbreakers | Soundtrack |
| A U G U S T | 6 | Sweet Relief II: Gravity of the Situation | Various Artists | Vic Chesnutt benefit album |
| A U G U S T | 8 | Ki-Oku | Toshinori Kondo and DJ Krush | - |
| A U G U S T | 9 | Theli | Therion | - |
| A U G U S T | 12 | Now That's What I Call Music! 34 (UK series) | Various Artists | Compilation |
| A U G U S T | 13 | Beautiful Freak | Eels | Debut |
| A U G U S T | 13 | Presents Author Unknown | Jason Falkner | Debut |
| A U G U S T | 13 | The Curtain Hits the Cast | Low | - |
| A U G U S T | 13 | Fantastic Planet | Failure | - |
| A U G U S T | 13 | Friction, Baby | Better Than Ezra | - |
| A U G U S T | 13 | Full Circle | Randy Travis | - |
| A U G U S T | 13 | Limbo | Throwing Muses | - |
| A U G U S T | 13 | Put it in Your Mouth | Akinyele | EP |
| A U G U S T | 13 | Turn the Radio Off | Reel Big Fish | - |
| A U G U S T | 13 | Unreleased and Revamped | Cypress Hill | EP |
| A U G U S T | 13 | Supersexy Swingin' Sounds | White Zombie | Remix |
| A U G U S T | 18 | Acrobatic Tenement | At the Drive-In | Debut |
| A U G U S T | 18 | Velvet Darkness They Fear | Theatre of Tragedy | - |
| A U G U S T | 19 | Becoming X | Sneaker Pimps | - |
| A U G U S T | 19 | Nothing for Juice | The Mountain Goats | - |
| A U G U S T | 20 | Cowboy Songs | Riders in the Sky | - |
| A U G U S T | 20 | Die for the Government | Anti-Flag | - |
| A U G U S T | 20 | Harmacy | Sebadoh | - |
| A U G U S T | 20 | Into the Unknown | Mercyful Fate | - |
| A U G U S T | 20 | Nada Es Igual | Luis Miguel | - |
| A U G U S T | 20 | October Rust | Type O Negative | - |
| A U G U S T | 20 | Omnipop (It's Only a Flesh Wound Lambchop) | Sam Phillips | - |
| A U G U S T | 20 | Paradise in Me | K's Choice | US |
| A U G U S T | 20 | Receiving the Gift of Flavor | The Urge | - |
| A U G U S T | 20 | Songs of Love and Hate | Godflesh | - |
| A U G U S T | 20 | Weird Food and Devastation | The Connells | - |
| A U G U S T | 26 | Awaken | The Blood Divine | - |
| A U G U S T | 26 | The Half Tail | Wolfstone | - |
| A U G U S T | 26 | Snap! Attack: The Best of Snap! | Snap! | Compilation |
| A U G U S T | 26 | Voyager | Mike Oldfield | - |
| A U G U S T | 27 | 112 | 112 | - |
| A U G U S T | 27 | ATLiens | OutKast | - |
| A U G U S T | 27 | Bad As I Wanna B | MC Lyte | - |
| A U G U S T | 27 | Don't Back Down | The Queers | - |
| A U G U S T | 27 | Joe Nichols | Joe Nichols | - |
| A U G U S T | 27 | The Latch-Key Child | A+ | - |
| A U G U S T | 27 | No Code | Pearl Jam | - |
| A U G U S T | 27 | One in a Million | Aaliyah | - |
| A U G U S T | 27 | Rent: Original Broadway Cast Recording | Broadway cast of Rent | - |
| A U G U S T | 27 | The Restless Kind | Travis Tritt | - |
| A U G U S T | 27 | A Small Circle of Friends: Germs | Various Artists | Germs tribute |
| A U G U S T | 27 | Veiled | Leah Andreone | - |
| A U G U S T | 28 | Dusk and Her Embrace | Cradle of Filth | - |
| A U G U S T | 28 | Still Life | The Paradise Motel | - |
| A U G U S T | 28 | Written in the Sand | Michael Schenker Group | - |
| S E P T E M B E R | 2 | Bilingual | Pet Shop Boys | - |
| S E P T E M B E R | 2 | Coming Up | Suede | - |
| S E P T E M B E R | 2 | Double Allergic | Powderfinger | - |
| S E P T E M B E R | 2 | A Happy Pocket | Trash Can Sinatras | - |
| S E P T E M B E R | 2 | Man | Neneh Cherry | - |
| S E P T E M B E R | 2 | Psyence | Hide | - |
| S E P T E M B E R | 2 | Universal | Orchestral Manoeuvres in the Dark | - |
| S E P T E M B E R | 3 | Did I Shave My Legs for This? | Deana Carter | US |
| S E P T E M B E R | 3 | Jennifer Love Hewitt | Jennifer Love Hewitt | - |
| S E P T E M B E R | 6 | First Band on the Moon | The Cardigans | Sweden |
| S E P T E M B E R | 9 | Another Level | Blackstreet | - |
| S E P T E M B E R | 9 | C'mon Kids | The Boo Radleys | - |
| S E P T E M B E R | 9 | Excerpts from a Love Circus | Lisa Germano | - |
| S E P T E M B E R | 9 | Face to Face | Face to Face | - |
| S E P T E M B E R | 9 | Forever Alone, Immortal | Lux Occulta | - |
| S E P T E M B E R | 9 | Like Cats and Dogs | Catherine Wheel | Compilation |
| S E P T E M B E R | 9 | Travelling Without Moving | Jamiroquai | UK |
| S E P T E M B E R | 9 | Wild Opera | No-Man | - |
| S E P T E M B E R | 10 | 30° Everywhere | The Promise Ring | - |
| S E P T E M B E R | 10 | The Doctor Came at Dawn | Smog | - |
| S E P T E M B E R | 10 | Genius + Love = Yo La Tengo | Yo La Tengo | - |
| S E P T E M B E R | 10 | High School High soundtrack | Various Artists | Soundtrack |
| S E P T E M B E R | 10 | Home Again | New Edition | - |
| S E P T E M B E R | 10 | Live Art | Bela Fleck & the Flecktones | - |
| S E P T E M B E R | 10 | Mr. Happy Go Lucky | John Mellencamp | - |
| S E P T E M B E R | 10 | Neurotic Outsiders | Neurotic Outsiders | - |
| S E P T E M B E R | 10 | New Adventures in Hi-Fi | R.E.M. | US |
| S E P T E M B E R | 10 | Nine Objects of Desire | Suzanne Vega | - |
| S E P T E M B E R | 10 | Not in My Airforce | Robert Pollard | - |
| S E P T E M B E R | 10 | Popular Favorites | Oblivians | - |
| S E P T E M B E R | 10 | Test for Echo | Rush | - |
| S E P T E M B E R | 10 | What Would the Community Think | Cat Power | - |
| S E P T E M B E R | 10 | William Bloke | Billy Bragg | - |
| S E P T E M B E R | 13 | Dynamite | Stina Nordenstam | - |
| S E P T E M B E R | 13 | Superbuick | Mushroomhead | - |
| S E P T E M B E R | 16 | Better Living Through Chemistry | Fatboy Slim | Debut |
| S E P T E M B E R | 16 | Endtroducing..... | DJ Shadow | UK |
| S E P T E M B E R | 16 | K | Kula Shaker | UK |
| S E P T E M B E R | 16 | In a Bar, Under the Sea | dEUS | - |
| S E P T E M B E R | 16 | Live Wired | Front Line Assembly | Live Album |
| S E P T E M B E R | 16 | Spiders | Space | - |
| S E P T E M B E R | 17 | Ænima | Tool | - |
| S E P T E M B E R | 17 | Appalachia Waltz | Yo-Yo Ma, Edgar Meyer & Mark O'Connor | - |
| S E P T E M B E R | 17 | Black Eye | Fluffy | - |
| S E P T E M B E R | 17 | Fashion Nugget | Cake | - |
| S E P T E M B E R | 17 | Fire Garden | Steve Vai | - |
| S E P T E M B E R | 17 | Rhythmeen | ZZ Top | - |
| S E P T E M B E R | 17 | Six | Whodini | - |
| S E P T E M B E R | 17 | White Light, White Heat, White Trash | Social Distortion | - |
| S E P T E M B E R | 20 | Freedom in the Groove | Joshua Redman | - |
| S E P T E M B E R | 23 | Animal Rights | Moby | - |
| S E P T E M B E R | 23 | Best of the Beast | Iron Maiden | Compilation |
| S E P T E M B E R | 23 | Louder Than Hell | Manowar | Europe |
| S E P T E M B E R | 23 | Londinium | Archive | - |
| S E P T E M B E R | 23 | Dance Hall at Louse Point | PJ Harvey and John Parish | - |
| S E P T E M B E R | 24 | Acid Bubblegum | Graham Parker | - |
| S E P T E M B E R | 24 | All the Nations Airports | Archers of Loaf | - |
| S E P T E M B E R | 24 | Everything Sucks | Descendents | - |
| S E P T E M B E R | 24 | FYULABA | SNFU | - |
| S E P T E M B E R | 24 | The Garden | Merril Bainbridge | US |
| S E P T E M B E R | 24 | The Genius of Komeda | Komeda | - |
| S E P T E M B E R | 24 | Illadelph Halflife | The Roots | - |
| S E P T E M B E R | 24 | Pinkerton | Weezer | - |
| S E P T E M B E R | 24 | Sheryl Crow | Sheryl Crow | - |
| S E P T E M B E R | 24 | Susanna Hoffs | Susanna Hoffs | - |
| S E P T E M B E R | 24 | That Thing You Do! Original Motion Picture Soundtrack | Various Artists | Soundtrack |
| S E P T E M B E R | 24 | Walking on Locusts | John Cale | - |
| S E P T E M B E R | 24 | Who Can You Trust? | Morcheeba | - |
| S E P T E M B E R | 27 | How Bizarre | OMC | - |
| S E P T E M B E R | 27 | Northern Exposure | Sasha and Digweed | DJ mix |
| S E P T E M B E R | 30 | Signify | Porcupine Tree | - |
| S E P T E M B E R | 30 | First Grand Constitution and Bylaws | Secret Chiefs 3 | - |
| S E P T E M B E R | 30 | Way Beyond Blue | Catatonia | Debut |

=== October–December ===
| Date | | Album | Artist | Notes |
|---|---|---|---|---|
| O C T O B E R | 1 | At the Speed of Life | Xzibit | - |
| O C T O B E R | 1 | Belly to Belly | Warrant | - |
| O C T O B E R | 1 | Black Dots | Bad Brains | - |
| O C T O B E R | 1 | Comic Book Whore | Jane Jensen | Debut |
| O C T O B E R | 1 | A Few Small Repairs | Shawn Colvin | - |
| O C T O B E R | 1 | Fountains of Wayne | Fountains of Wayne | Debut |
| O C T O B E R | 1 | From the Muddy Banks of the Wishkah | Nirvana | Live Compilation |
| O C T O B E R | 1 | The Graveyard | King Diamond | - |
| O C T O B E R | 1 | Greatest Hits | Thompson Twins | Compilation |
| O C T O B E R | 1 | The Moment | Kenny G | - |
| O C T O B E R | 1 | The Natural Bridge | Silver Jews | - |
| O C T O B E R | 1 | Soul on Ice | Ras Kass | - |
| O C T O B E R | 1 | This Is the Time | Michael Bolton | Christmas |
| O C T O B E R | 1 | Yourself or Someone Like You | Matchbox 20 | Debut |
| O C T O B E R | 1 | A Worm's Life | Crash Test Dummies | - |
| O C T O B E R | 2 | Black Earth | Arch Enemy | - |
| O C T O B E R | 4 | Angry Machines | Dio | Japan |
| O C T O B E R | 7 | Broken China | Richard Wright | - |
| O C T O B E R | 8 | Antichrist Superstar | Marilyn Manson | - |
| O C T O B E R | 8 | All Because of You | Daryle Singletary | - |
| O C T O B E R | 8 | Baja Sessions | Chris Isaak | - |
| O C T O B E R | 8 | Brown | P.O.D. | - |
| O C T O B E R | 8 | Cheer Up | Plexi | Debut |
| O C T O B E R | 8 | Christmas Island | Jimmy Buffett | Christmas |
| O C T O B E R | 8 | Club Chipmunk: The Dance Mixes | The Chipmunks | - |
| O C T O B E R | 8 | East Side Militia | Chemlab | - |
| O C T O B E R | 8 | Factory Showroom | They Might Be Giants | - |
| O C T O B E R | 8 | Ginuwine... the Bachelor | Ginuwine | - |
| O C T O B E R | 8 | Karen Carpenter | Karen Carpenter | - |
| O C T O B E R | 8 | No Doubt | 702 | - |
| O C T O B E R | 8 | No Talking, Just Head | The Heads | Members of Talking Heads |
| O C T O B E R | 8 | Satan Is Real Again, or Feeling Good About Bad Thoughts | Country Teasers | - |
| O C T O B E R | 8 | Sunburnt | Martin Phillipps and The Chills | - |
| O C T O B E R | 8 | Tell Me Something: The Songs of Mose Allison | Van Morrison, Georgie Fame, Mose Allison and Ben Sidran | - |
| O C T O B E R | 8 | The Third Rail | Railroad Jerk | - |
| O C T O B E R | 8 | Under These Rocks and Stones | Chantal Kreviazuk | CAN |
| O C T O B E R | 11 | The Starres Are Marching Sadly Home (Theinmostlightthirdandfinal) | Current 93 | EP |
| O C T O B E R | 14 | Like Gods of the Sun | My Dying Bride | - |
| O C T O B E R | 14 | Interpreter | Julian Cope | - |
| O C T O B E R | 14 | Ivy and the Big Apples | Spiderbait | - |
| O C T O B E R | 14 | Sutras | Donovan | - |
| O C T O B E R | 15 | Billy Breathes | Phish | - |
| O C T O B E R | 15 | Breathe | Midnight Oil | - |
| O C T O B E R | 15 | Car Button Cloth | The Lemonheads | - |
| O C T O B E R | 15 | Corey Hart | Corey Hart | - |
| O C T O B E R | 15 | Genius of America | The Tubes | - |
| O C T O B E R | 15 | Justus | The Monkees | - |
| O C T O B E R | 15 | Kind Hearted Woman | Michelle Shocked | - |
| O C T O B E R | 15 | Life Is Peachy | Korn | - |
| O C T O B E R | 15 | No Doy | Moe | - |
| O C T O B E R | 15 | Now I Got Worry | The Jon Spencer Blues Explosion | - |
| O C T O B E R | 15 | Overnight Sensation | Motörhead | - |
| O C T O B E R | 15 | The Past Didn't Go Anywhere | Ani DiFranco and Utah Philips | - |
| O C T O B E R | 15 | Recovering the Satellites | Counting Crows | - |
| O C T O B E R | 15 | Red Hot + Rio | Various Artists | Red Hot Organization AIDS benefit |
| O C T O B E R | 15 | Shack-man | Medeski, Martin & Wood | - |
| O C T O B E R | 15 | Stories Told & Untold | Bad Company | - |
| O C T O B E R | 15 | This Fire | Paula Cole | - |
| O C T O B E R | 15 | Wiseblood | Corrosion of Conformity | - |
| O C T O B E R | 15 | Wrath of the Math | Jeru the Damaja | - |
| O C T O B E R | 19 | Trailer Park | Beth Orton | - |
| O C T O B E R | 21 | Dance into the Light | Phil Collins | - |
| O C T O B E R | 21 | Young in Love | Aaron Pritchett | - |
| O C T O B E R | 22 | 12 Soulful Nights of Christmas | Jermaine Dupri | Christmas |
| O C T O B E R | 22 | Autobiography of Mistachuck | Chuck D | - |
| O C T O B E R | 22 | Bow Down | Westside Connection | - |
| O C T O B E R | 22 | Business Is Business | PMD | - |
| O C T O B E R | 22 | The Day | Babyface | - |
| O C T O B E R | 22 | Firing Squad | M.O.P. | - |
| O C T O B E R | 22 | Get Off the Cross, We Need the Wood for the Fire | Firewater | Debut |
| O C T O B E R | 22 | Motel California | Ugly Kid Joe | - |
| O C T O B E R | 22 | Public Cowboy #1: The Music of Gene Autry | Riders in the Sky | - |
| O C T O B E R | 22 | Remember | Rusted Root | - |
| O C T O B E R | 22 | Soundtracks for the Blind | Swans | - |
| O C T O B E R | 22 | Time Will Reveal | Above the Law | - |
| O C T O B E R | 22 | Trial by Fire | Journey | - |
| O C T O B E R | 22 | Truth Crushed to Earth Shall Rise Again | House of Pain | - |
| O C T O B E R | 23 | Actual Fantasy | Ayreon | - |
| O C T O B E R | 24 | Goatlord | Darkthrone | Demo |
| O C T O B E R | 25 | Long Season | Fishmans | - |
| O C T O B E R | 25 | Thank God for Mental Illness | The Brian Jonestown Massacre | - |
| O C T O B E R | 28 | The Beatles Anthology, Volume 3 | The Beatles | Compilation; UK |
| O C T O B E R | 28 | Evita | Madonna | Soundtrack |
| O C T O B E R | 28 | Keys to Ascension | Yes | Studio + Live |
| O C T O B E R | 28 | A Different Beat | Boyzone | - |
| O C T O B E R | 28 | Hubert Kah | Hubert Kah | - |
| O C T O B E R | 29 | Space Jam: Music from and Inspired by the Motion Picture | Various Artists | Soundtrack |
| O C T O B E R | 29 | Romeo + Juliet | Various Artists | Soundtrack |
| O C T O B E R | 29 | American Hardcore | L.A. Guns | - |
| O C T O B E R | 29 | Among My Swan | Mazzy Star | - |
| O C T O B E R | 29 | Archaeology | The Rutles | - |
| O C T O B E R | 29 | Being There | Wilco | Double album |
| O C T O B E R | 29 | Danzig 5: Blackacidevil | Danzig | - |
| O C T O B E R | 29 | Da Storm | O.G.C. | - |
| O C T O B E R | 29 | Everything I Love | Alan Jackson | - |
| O C T O B E R | 29 | Fever In Fever Out | Luscious Jackson | - |
| O C T O B E R | 29 | From I Extreme II Another | II D Extreme | - |
| O C T O B E R | 29 | Ironman | Ghostface Killah | - |
| O C T O B E R | 29 | Mic City Sons | Heatmiser | - |
| O C T O B E R | 29 | Skillet | Skillet | - |
| O C T O B E R | 31 | Back in the Shootin' Match | Ace Troubleshooter | - |
| O C T O B E R | 31 | Mate. Feed. Kill. Repeat. | Slipknot | - |
| O C T O B E R | ? | The Acoustic Album | Toyah | - |
| O C T O B E R | ? | Hacked Up for Barbecue | Mortician | - |
| N O V E M B E R | 4 | Around the World Hit Singles: The Journey So Far | East 17 | Compilation |
| N O V E M B E R | 4 | Dahlia | X Japan | - |
| N O V E M B E R | 4 | Richard D. James Album | Aphex Twin | |
| N O V E M B E R | 4 | Spice | Spice Girls | Debut |
| N O V E M B E R | 5 | II | The Presidents of the United States of America | - |
| N O V E M B E R | 5 | Beavis and Butt-head Do America: Original Motion Picture Soundtrack | Various Artists | Soundtrack |
| N O V E M B E R | 5 | The Don Killuminati: The 7 Day Theory | Makaveli | - |
| N O V E M B E R | 5 | Early Recordings | Joan Osborne | - |
| N O V E M B E R | 5 | Just the Same | Terri Clark | - |
| N O V E M B E R | 5 | The Politics of Ecstasy | Nevermore | - |
| N O V E M B E R | 5 | Ride the Fader | Chavez | - |
| N O V E M B E R | 5 | Star Bright | Vanessa Williams | Christmas |
| N O V E M B E R | 5 | Take You There | k-os | - |
| N O V E M B E R | 5 | Tierna La Noche | Fey | - |
| N O V E M B E R | 5 | Unchained | Johnny Cash | - |
| N O V E M B E R | 5 | Unknown Country | The Clean | - |
| N O V E M B E R | 8 | Sahra | Khaled | – |
| N O V E M B E R | 11 | Voice of Love | Diana Ross | Compilation +3 new tracks |
| N O V E M B E R | 11 | Dizzy Heights | The Lightning Seeds | – |
| N O V E M B E R | 11 | Spice | Spice Girls | US |
| N O V E M B E R | 11 | Pre-Millennium Tension | Tricky | - |
| N O V E M B E R | 12 | About to Choke | Vic Chesnutt | - |
| N O V E M B E R | 12 | Beat | Bowery Electric | - |
| N O V E M B E R | 12 | Tha Doggfather | Snoop Doggy Dogg | - |
| N O V E M B E R | 12 | Epiphany: The Best of Chaka Khan, Vol. 1 | Chaka Khan | Compilation |
| N O V E M B E R | 12 | Hard Core | Lil' Kim | Debut |
| N O V E M B E R | 12 | Infinite | Eminem | Debut |
| N O V E M B E R | 12 | Losing Streak | Less Than Jake | - |
| N O V E M B E R | 12 | Nico | Blind Melon | Compilation |
| N O V E M B E R | 12 | Paegan Terrorism Tactics | Acid Bath | - |
| N O V E M B E R | 18 | Dusk and Her Embrace | Cradle of Filth | - |
| N O V E M B E R | 18 | Beloved | Glay | - |
| N O V E M B E R | 18 | If You're Feeling Sinister | Belle & Sebastian | - |
| N O V E M B E R | 18 | Now That's What I Call Music! 35 (UK series) | Various Artists | Compilation |
| N O V E M B E R | 19 | Daylight: Music from the Motion Picture | Ralph Edelman and Various Artists | Soundtrack |
| N O V E M B E R | 19 | Dru Hill | Dru Hill | - |
| N O V E M B E R | 19 | Emancipation | Prince | 3xCD |
| N O V E M B E R | 19 | Hell on Earth | Mobb Deep | - |
| N O V E M B E R | 19 | House of Music | Tony! Toni! Toné! | - |
| N O V E M B E R | 19 | Ill Na Na | Foxy Brown | - |
| N O V E M B E R | 19 | Life in General | MxPx | - |
| N O V E M B E R | 19 | Razorblade Suitcase | Bush | US |
| N O V E M B E R | 19 | Rock Spectacle | Barenaked Ladies | Live album |
| N O V E M B E R | 19 | Summer of '78 | Barry Manilow | - |
| N O V E M B E R | 19 | Sunfish Holy Breakfast | Guided by Voices | - |
| N O V E M B E R | 21 | Plugged in Permanent | Anvil | - |
| N O V E M B E R | 22 | Cacy Cacy Fleischmaschine | Świetliki | - |
| N O V E M B E R | 22 | Le Roi Est Mort, Vive Le Roi! | Enigma | - |
| N O V E M B E R | 22 | Wiggly, Wiggly Christmas | The Wiggles | Christmas |
| N O V E M B E R | 25 | Enter Suicidal Angels | Dark Tranquillity | - |
| N O V E M B E R | 25 | Friends II | B'z | EP |
| N O V E M B E R | 25 | Present | Sun Electric | - |
| N O V E M B E R | 25 | Someday Maybe | The Clarks | - |
| N O V E M B E R | 25 | Telegram | Björk | UK; Remix |
| N O V E M B E R | 25 | The Week Never Starts Round Here | Arab Strap | Debut |
| N O V E M B E R | 26 | The Aeroplane Flies High | The Smashing Pumpkins | Box Set |
| N O V E M B E R | 26 | Death Row Greatest Hits | Death Row Records | Compilation |
| N O V E M B E R | 26 | Dr. Dre Presents: The Aftermath | Various Artists | Compilation |
| N O V E M B E R | 26 | Enigma | Keith Murray | - |
| N O V E M B E R | 26 | Poison's Greatest Hits: 1986–1996 | Poison | Compilation |
| N O V E M B E R | 26 | The Preacher's Wife: Original Soundtrack Album | Whitney Houston | Soundtrack |
| N O V E M B E R | 29 | Switchstance | Quarashi | EP |
| N O V E M B E R | 29 | Tormented | Staind | Debut |
| N O V E M B E R | 29 | Upbeats and Beatdowns | Five Iron Frenzy | Debut |
| N O V E M B E R | ? | Atom-Powered Action! | Bis | EP |
| N O V E M B E R | ? | Envy of Angels | The Mutton Birds | - |
| N O V E M B E R | ? | Further Along | The Dubliners | - |
| N O V E M B E R | ? | Live Around the World | Meat Loaf | Live |
| D E C E M B E R | 1 | Hi Scores | Boards of Canada | EP |
| D E C E M B E R | 2 | Telling Everybody | Human Nature | - |
| D E C E M B E R | 3 | Christmas on Death Row | Various Artists | Christmas |
| D E C E M B E R | 3 | Nerf Herder | Nerf Herder | - |
| D E C E M B E R | 3 | One Fierce Beer Coaster | Bloodhound Gang | - |
| D E C E M B E R | 3 | Punk-O-Rama Vol. 2 | Various Artists | Compilation |
| D E C E M B E R | 10 | Five Smokin' Tracks from Lit | Lit | EP |
| D E C E M B E R | 10 | Lama Rabi Rabi | Ghost | - |
| D E C E M B E R | 10 | Muddy Waters | Redman | - |
| D E C E M B E R | 10 | This Is Teen-C Power! | Bis | EP |
| D E C E M B E R | 12 | True | L'Arc-en-Ciel | - |
| D E C E M B E R | 16 | Machines Against the Rage | TISM | Live |
| D E C E M B E R | 17 | 666.667 Club | Noir Désir | - |
| D E C E M B E R | 18 | Imaginator | Nelson | Japanese release date |

=== Release date unknown ===
- All the Pretty Little Horses – Current 93
- Better Can't Make Your Life Better – Lilys
- Bleed Your Cedar – Elysian Fields
- Blend – BoDeans
- Boc Maxima – Boards of Canada
- Chixdiggit! – Chixdiggit
- Classics – Joey Beltram
- The Closing Chronicles – Nightingale
- Corey Hart – Corey Hart
- Dead Man Walking – Various Artists
- Digilogue (compact disc version) – :zoviet*France:
- Creature – Moist
- Eleventeen (EP) – Eve 6
- Experiment Zero – Man or Astro-man?
- Garibaldi Guard! – U.S. Bombs
- G. – Gotthard
- Get Fired Up – Murk
- Get Your Legs Broke – Len
- Hamsters of Rock (EP) – Spacehog
- Hank Plays Holly – Hank Marvin
- Hank Plays Live – Hank Marvin
- Introducing Save Ferris (EP) – Save Ferris
- Irène Schweizer & Han Bennink – Irène Schweizer and Han Bennink
- Katatonia/Primordial – Katatonia/Primordial
- La Passione – Chris Rea
- Lucky – Skin
- Lynda – Lynda Thomas
- Petitioning the Empty Sky – Converge
- A Man Amongst Men – Bo Diddley
- Message from Home – Pharoah Sanders
- Moss Elixir – Robyn Hitchcock
- Music of Hair – Andrew Bird
- Mystic Journey – Arlo Guthrie
- Nénette et Boni – Tindersticks
- Neu! '72 Live in Düsseldorf – Neu!
- Notwithstanding – Chalk FarM
- Out of the Everywhere – Angie Aparo
- Pussy, King of the Pirates – The Mekons and Kathy Acker
- Remy Zero – Remy Zero
- The Secret Vampire Soundtrack – Bis – EP
- Shady Grove – Jerry Garcia & David Grisman
- Shakespearean Fish – Melanie Doane
- Silent Steeples – Dispatch
- Six Pence for the Sauces (EP) – Drake Tungsten
- The Smiths Is Dead – Various Artists – The Smiths tribute
- Tao of the One Inch Punch – One Inch Punch
- Time – Steeleye Span
- Using Sickness as a Hero – Human Remains
- Wild Hog in the Red Brush – John Hartford
- XTC – Anthony Hamilton

== Biggest hit singles ==
The following songs achieved the highest chart positions in the charts of 1996.

| # | Artist | Title | Year | Country | Chart entries |
|---|---|---|---|---|---|
| 1 | Spice Girls | "Wannabe" | 1996 | UK | UK 1 – Jul 1996, US BB 1 of 1997, Netherlands 1 – Aug 1996, Sweden 1 – Aug 1996, Switzerland 1 – Aug 1996, Norway 1 – Aug 1996, Germany 1 – Aug 1996, Republic of Ireland 1 – Aug 1996, New Zealand 1 for 1 week Nov 1996, Australia 1 for 11 weeks Jan 1997, US BB 3 of 1997, POP 3 of 1997, Austria 4 – Aug 1996, Australia 5 of 1996, Poland 22 – Aug 1996, Italy 31 of 1996, Global 33 (5 M sold) – 1996, Scrobulate 59 of pop, RYM 94 of 1996, Germany 170 of the 1990s, OzNet 963, Acclaimed 1504 |
| 2 | Los Del Rio | "Macarena" | 1995 | Spain | US BB 1 of 1996, Netherlands 1 – Aug 1993, Austria 1 – Feb 1996, Switzerland 1 – Mar 1996, Germany 1 – Apr 1996, Australia 1 for 9 weeks Nov 1996, UK 2 – Jul 1996, US BB 2 of 1996, Norway 2 – Jun 1996, Australia 2 of 1996, POP 2 of 1996, Global 7 (10 M sold) – 1993, Sweden 8 – Jun 1996, Germany 26 of the 1990s, Party 102 of 2007 |
| 3 | Fugees | "Killing Me Softly with His Song" | 1996 | US | UK 1 - Jun 1996 (20 weeks), Holland 1 - Jun 1996 (15 weeks), Finland 1 for 7 weeks - Jul 1996, Austria 1 - Jul 1996 (5 months), Switzerland 1 - Jun 1996 (27 weeks), Norway 1 - Jun 1996 (18 weeks), Belgium 1 - Jul 1996 (17 weeks), Italy 1 for 6 weeks - Jul 1996, Germany 1 - Jun 1996 (5 months), New Zealand 1 for 3 weeks - May 1996, Australia 1 for 7 weeks - Jun 1996, Europe 1 for 8 weeks - Jul 1996, Sweden 5 - Aug 1996 (4 weeks), Switzerland 6 of 1996, Italy 6 of 1996, Brazil 11 of 1996, Japan (Tokyo) 12 - Apr 1996 (22 weeks), US Radio 15 of 1996 (peak 1 16 weeks), POP 21 of 1996 |
| 4 | Celine Dion | "Because You Loved Me" | 1996 | Canada | US Billboard 1 – Mar 1996 (33 weeks), Japan (Tokyo) 1 – Mar 1996 (19 weeks), Australia 1 of 1996, Australia 1 for 3 weeks – Aug 1996, ASCAP song of 1996, Oscar in 1996 (film 'Up Close & Personal') (Nominated), Grammy in 1996 (Nominated), Golden Globe in 1996 (film 'Up Close & Personal') (Nominated), US Platinum (certified by RIAA in Apr 1996), US BB 3 of 1996, Switzerland 3 – Jun 1996 (32 weeks), ARC 4 of 1996 (peak 1 22 weeks), Holland 4 – May 1996 (15 weeks), Poland 4 – May 1996 (20 weeks), Germany Gold (certified by BMieV in 1996), POP 4 of 1996, UK 5 – Jun 1996 (16 weeks), Belgium 5 – Jun 1996 (16 weeks), US Radio 9 of 1996 (peak 1 21 weeks), Japan (Osaku) 11 of 1996 (peak 2 22 weeks), Sweden 12 – Aug 1996 (4 weeks), Germany 13 – Oct 1996 (3 months), Brazil 19 of 1996, Switzerland 20 of 1996, Austria 23 – Jun 1996 (3 weeks), UK Silver (certified by BPI in Jun 1996), Party 134 of 1999 |
| 5 | Toni Braxton | "Un-Break My Heart" | 1996 | US | US Billboard 1 - Oct 1996 (42 weeks), Sweden 1 - Nov 1996 (12 weeks), Brazil 1 of 1997, Switzerland 1 - Dec 1996 (29 weeks), Poland 1 - Nov 1996 (26 weeks), Europe 1 for 2 weeks - Jan 1997, UK 2 - Nov 1996 (19 weeks), Holland 2 - Oct 1996 (19 weeks), Norway 2 - Dec 1996 (23 weeks), Belgium 2 - Jan 1997 (22 weeks), Germany 2 - Jan 1997 (6 months), ODK Germany 2 - Nov 1996 (31 weeks) (14 weeks in top 10), US Platinum (certified by RIAA in Dec 1996), UK Platinum (certified by BPI in Jan 1997), US BB 4 of 1997, Austria 4 - Jan 1997 (5 months), France Gold (certified by SNEP in Jun 1997), Switzerland 7 of 1997, ARC 8 of 1996 (peak 1 19 weeks), Japan (Tokyo) 9 - Nov 1996 (26 weeks) |

== Top 40 Chart hit singles ==
| Song title | Artist(s) | Release date(s) | US | UK | Highest chart position | Other Chart Performance(s) |
|---|---|---|---|---|---|---|
| "1, 2, 3, 4 (Sumpin' New)" | Coolio | February 1996 | 5 | 13 | 2 (Iceland, New Zealand) | See chart performance entry |
| "1979" | The Smashing Pumpkins | January 1996 | 12 | 16 | 2 (Canada, Iceland) | See chart performance entry |
| *"All By Myself" | Céline Dion | December 1996 | 4 | 6 | 1 (Canada) | See chart performance entry |
| "Always Be My Baby" | Mariah Carey | May 1996 | 1 | 3 | 1 (Canada, United States) | See chart performance entry |
| "Bailando" | Paradisio | September 1996 | n/a | n/a | 1 (5 countries) | See chart performance entry |
| "Cosmic Girl" | Jamiroquai | November 1996 | n/a | 6 | 2 (Belgium) | See chart performance entry |
| "Firestarter" | The Prodigy | March 1996 | 30 | 1 | 1 (5 countries) | See chart performance entry |

=== Other Chart hit singles ===
- "2 of Amerikaz Most Wanted" - 2Pac & Snoop Dogg
- "A Design for Life" - Manic Street Preachers
- "Ahead by a Century" – The Tragically Hip
- "Aicha" – Khaled
- "Beautiful Ones" – Suede
- "The Beautiful People" – Marilyn Manson
- "Because You Loved Me" – Celine Dion
- "Before" – Pet Shop Boys
- "Betcha by Golly, Wow" – Prince
- "Between You And Me" – dc Talk
- "Beyond the Invisible" – Enigma
- "Big Bang Baby" – Stone Temple Pilots
- "Blue Jeans" – Lynda Thomas
- "Bohemian Rhapsody" - The Braids
- "Boomerang" – Blümchen
- "Born Slippy .NUXX" – Underworld
- "Bound for the Floor" – Local H
- "Brain Stew / Jaded" – Green Day
- "Break My Stride" – Unique II
- "Breakfast at Tiffany's" – Deep Blue Something
- "Breathe" – The Prodigy
- "Bullet with Butterfly Wings" – The Smashing Pumpkins
- "Bulls on Parade" – Rage Against the Machine
- "Burden in My Hand" – Soundgarden
- "California Love" – Tupac Shakur / Dr. Dre
- "Champagne Supernova" – Oasis
- "Change the World" – Eric Clapton
- "Charmless Man" – Blur
- "Child" – Mark Owen
- "Children" – Robert Miles
- "C'Mon N' Ride It (The Train)" – Quad City DJ's
- "Coco Jamboo" – Mr. President
- "Cold Rock a Party" – MC Lyte & Missy Elliott
- "Crash Into Me" – Dave Matthews Band
- "Crying in the Rain" – Culture Beat
- "Da Bomb" – Inner Circle
- "Dance into the Light" – Phil Collins
- "Desperately Wanting" – Better Than Ezra
- "Do You Know (What It Takes)" – Robyn
- "Don't Look Back in Anger" – Oasis
- "Don't Speak" – No Doubt
- "Don't Stop Movin'" – Livin' Joy
- "Down" – 311
- "Drill Instructor" – Captain Jack
- "E-Bow the Letter" – R.E.M. & Patti Smith
- "El Amor No Tiene Edad" – Lynda Thomas
- "Everyday Is a Winding Road" – Sheryl Crow
- "Everything Falls Apart" – Dog's Eye View
- "Fable" – Robert Miles
- "Falling into You" – Celine Dion
- "Fastlove" – George Michael
- "Flava" – Peter Andre
- "Follow You Down" – Gin Blossoms
- "Forever Love" – Gary Barlow
- "Free as a Bird" – The Beatles
- "Freed from Desire" – Gala
- "Freedom" – Robbie Williams
- "Fu-Gee-La" – Fugees
- "Funky" – Tic Tac Toe
- "Get Down (You're the One for Me)" – Backstreet Boys
- "Get Money" – Junior M.A.F.I.A.
- "Gira Que Gira" – Lynda Thomas
- "Give Me One Reason" – Tracy Chapman
- "GoldenEye" – Tina Turner
- "Goldfinger" - Ash
- "Guilty" – Gravity Kills
- "Hand in My Pocket" – Alanis Morissette
- "Head over Feet" – Alanis Morissette
- "Heaven" – U96
- "Heaven Beside You" – Alice in Chains
- "Hero of the Day" – Metallica
- "How Bizarre" – OMC
- "How Can You Live With Yourself" – The Tubes
- "How Deep Is Your Love" – Take That
- "How Do U Want It" – Tupac Shakur
- "I Ain't Mad at Cha" – 2Pac
- "I Believe I Can Fly" – R. Kelly
- "I Belong to You" – Gina G
- "I Can't Help Myself" – The Kelly Family
- "I Don't Wanna Be a Star" – Corona
- "I Feel You" - Peter Andre
- "I Give You My Heart" – Mr. President
- "I Love You Always Forever" – Donna Lewis
- "I Need You" – 3T
- "I Want to Come Over" – Melissa Etheridge
- "I Want You Back" – 'N Sync
- "Ich Find' Dich Scheisse" – Tic Tac Toe
- "If I Ruled the World (Imagine That)" – Nas & Lauryn Hill
- "If It Makes You Happy" – Sheryl Crow
- "If You Ever" – East 17 & Gabrielle
- "If Your Girl Only Knew" – Aaliyah
- "I'll Never Break Your Heart" – Backstreet Boys
- "I'll Stick Around" – Foo Fighters
- "I'm Raving" – Scooter
- "In the Meantime" – Spacehog
- "Insomnia" – Faithless
- "Ironic" – Alanis Morissette
- "It's All Coming Back to Me Now" – Celine Dion
- "It's Oh So Quiet" – Björk
- "Jealousy" – Natalie Merchant
- "Jesus to a Child" – George Michael
- "Keep On Jumpin'" – Todd Terry & Martha Wash & Jocelyn Brown
- "Killing Me Softly With His Song" – Fugees
- "King of New Orleans" – Better Than Ezra
- "King Nothing" – Metallica
- "Kleiner Satellit (Piep, Piep)" – Blümchen
- "Knockin' on Heaven's Door" - Dunblane
- "Last Night" – Az Yet
- "Let's Make a Night to Remember" – Bryan Adams
- "Lemon Tree" – Fool's Garden
- "Loungin" – LL Cool J & Total
- "Love Don't Live Here Anymore" – Madonna
- "Love Message" – Love Message
- "Macarena" – Los Del Mar
- "Macarena" – Los Del Rio
- "Mama Said" – Metallica
- "Mysterious Girl" – Peter Andre
- "Name" – Goo Goo Dolls
- "Never Gonna Say I'm Sorry" – Ace of Base
- "A Neverending Dream" – X-Perience
- "Nobody" – Keith Sweat & Athena Cage
- "Nobody Knows" – The Tony Rich Project
- "No Diggity" – Blackstreet & Dr. Dre
- "Novocaine for the Soul" – Eels
- "No Woman No Cry" – Fugees
- "Number One" – Alexia
- "Old Man & Me (When I Get to Heaven)" - Hootie & the Blowfish
- "One and One" – Robert Miles
- "One by One" – Cher
- "One Headlight" – The Wallflowers
- "One in a Million" – Aaliyah
- "One More Chance" – Madonna
- "One Sweet Day" – Mariah Carey & Boyz II Men
- "The Only Thing That Looks Good on Me Is You" – Bryan Adams
- "Ooh Aah...Just a Little Bit" – Gina G
- "Open Arms" – Mariah Carey
- "Over Now" – Alice in Chains
- "Paparazzi" - Xzibit
- "Pepper" – Butthole Surfers
- "Peaches" – The Presidents of the United States of America
- "People of the Sun" – Rage Against the Machine
- "Pony" – Ginuwine
- "Popular" – Nada Surf
- "Pray" – DJ BoBo
- "Pretty Noose" – Soundgarden
- "Professional Widow" – Tori Amos
- "Quit Playing Games (With My Heart)" – Backstreet Boys
- "Reach" – Gloria Estefan
- "Ready or Not" – Fugees
- "Real Love" – The Beatles
- "Rebel Yell" – Scooter
- "Return of the Mack" – Mark Morrison
- "Roses Are Red" – Aqua
- "Salva Mea" – Faithless
- "Salvation" – The Cranberries
- "Se a vida e (That's the Way Life Is)" – Pet Shop Boys
- "Setting Sun" – The Chemical Brothers
- "Seven Days and One Week" – B.B.E.
- "Sexy Eyes" – Whigfield
- "Sinnerman" – Extra Fancy
- "Slight Return" – The Bluetones
- "So Strung Out" – C-Block
- "Soldier, Soldier" – Captain Jack
- "Spaceman" – Babylon Zoo
- "Spinning the Wheel" – George Michael
- "Standing Outside a Broken Phone Booth with Money in My Hand" – Primitive Radio Gods
- "Stranger in Moscow" – Michael Jackson
- "Street Dreams" – Nas
- "Stupid Girl" – Garbage
- "Summer Is Crazy" – Alexia
- "Take Cover" – Mr. Big
- "Tattva" – Kula Shaker
- "Tha Crossroads" – Bone Thugs-N-Harmony
- "That Girl" – Maxi Priest & Shaggy
- "That Thing You Do!" – The Wonders
- "That's What My Love Is For" – Anne Murray & Aaron Neville
- "The 13th" – The Cure
- "Theme from Mission: Impossible" – Adam Clayton & Larry Mullen
- "They Don't Care About Us" – Michael Jackson
- "Three Lions" – Baddiel & Skinner & Lightning Seeds
- "Tic, Tic Tac" – Carrapicho
- "Time to Say Goodbye" – Andrea Bocelli & Sarah Brightman
- "Throw These Guns Away" - Dunblane
- "To Love You More" – Celine Dion
- "Tonight, Tonight" – The Smashing Pumpkins
- "Trash" – Suede
- "Tucker's Town" – Hootie & the Blowfish
- "Twisted" – Keith Sweat
- "Un-Break My Heart" – Toni Braxton
- "Until It Sleeps" – Metallica
- "Vapors" – Snoop Doggy Dogg
- "Verpiss' dich" – Tic Tac Toe
- "Virtual Insanity" – Jamiroquai
- "Walking on the Milky Way" – OMD
- "Wannabe" – Spice Girls
- "We've Got It Goin' On" – Backstreet Boys
- "When You're Gone" – The Cranberries
- "What I Got" – Sublime
- "Whatever You Want" – Tina Turner
- "What's Love Got to Do with It" – Warren G
- "Where Do You Go" – No Mercy
- "Where It's At" – Beck
- "Who Wants to Live Forever" – Dune
- "Who Will Save Your Soul" – Jewel
- "Who You Are" – Pearl Jam
- "Why" – 3T & Michael Jackson
- "Wonder" – Natalie Merchant
- "Wonderwall" – Oasis
- "Woo Hah!! Got You All in Check" – Busta Rhymes
- "Words" – Boyzone
- "Wrong" – Everything but the Girl
- "The X-Files" – DJ Dado
- "The X-Files" – Mark Snow
- "You Don't Fool Me" – Queen
- "You Learn" – Alanis Morissette
- "You Must Love Me" – Madonna
- "You Oughta Know" – Alanis Morissette
- "You Showed Me" – The Lightning Seeds
- "You Were Meant For Me" – Jewel
- "You're Makin' Me High" – Toni Braxton
- "Zehn kleine Jagermeister" – Die Toten Hosen
- "Zero" – The Smashing Pumpkins

== Notable singles ==
| Song title | Artist(s) | Release date(s) | Other Chart Performance(s) |
|---|---|---|---|
| "1979" | The Smashing Pumpkins | January 1996 | See chart performance entry |

=== Other Notable singles ===
- "Elevator Song" – Dubstar

== Classical music ==
- Torstein Aagaard-Nilsen – Trumpet Concerto No. 2
- Michael Berkeley – Viola Concerto (revised)
- Elliott Carter – Clarinet Concerto
- Mario Davidovsky – Quartet No. 2 for oboe, violin, viola, violoncello
- Peter Maxwell Davies –
  - Strathclyde Concerto No 10: Concerto for Orchestra
  - Symphony No. 6
- Joël-François Durand – Les raisons des forces mouvantes for organ
- Lorenzo Ferrero – My Piece of Africa, for violin, viola, violoncello, and contrabass
- Francesco Filidei – Danza macabra, for organ
- Joep Franssens
  - Sanctus for orchestra
  - Winter Child for piano
- Vinko Globokar – Oblak Semen, for trombone
- Alexander Goehr – Viola Concerto
- Sofia Gubaidulina – Viola Concerto
- Hans Werner Henze – Labyrinth (revision of 1951 work)
- Wojciech Kilar –
  - Agnus Dei for mixed choir a cappella
  - Piano Concerto No. 1
- Frederik Magle – Christmas cantata: A newborn child, before eternity, God!
- John Pickard – Third Symphony
- David Sawer – Tiroirs
- John Serry Sr. – Five Children's Pieces, for piano
- Juan Maria Solare – Diez Estudios Escénicos
- Karlheinz Stockhausen – Orchester-Finalisten

== Opera ==
- Lorenzo Ferrero – La nascita di Orfeo
- Daron Hagen – Vera of Las Vegas
- Franz Hummel – Gesualdo (14 January 1996, Kaiserslautern)
- James MacMillan – Inés de Castro
- Michael Obst – Solaris (4 December, Muffathalle, Munich Biennale)
- Karlheinz Stockhausen – Freitag aus Licht (12 September, Leipzig Opera)

== Musical theater ==
- Chicago (Kander and Ebb) – Broadway revival
- A Funny Thing Happened on the Way to the Forum (Stephen Sondheim) – Broadway revival
- I Love You, You're Perfect, Now Change – off Broadway production
- The King and I (Rodgers and Hammerstein) – Broadway revival
- Once Upon a Mattress – Broadway revival
- Rent (Jonathan Larson) – Broadway production opened at the Nederlander Theatre and ran until 2008
- State Fair – Broadway production opened at the Music Box Theatre and ran for 110 performances

== Musical films ==
- Aur Ek Prem Kahani
- Everyone Says I Love You
- Evita
- Glastonbury the Movie
- Grace of My Heart
- Hommage à Noir
- The Hunchback of Notre Dame
- Hype!
- James and the Giant Peach
- Saajan Chale Sasural
- That Thing You Do!

== Births ==
- January 1
  - Kun, Chinese singer (WayV)
  - Stunna 4 Vegas, American rapper and songwriter
- January 3
  - Florence Pugh, English actress and singer-songwriter
  - MohBad, Nigerian musician (d. 2023)
- January 12 – Ella Henderson, English singer and songwriter
- January 13 – Lauren Sanderson, American singer-songwriter
- January 15 – Dove Cameron, American actress and singer
- January 16 – Jennie Kim, South Korean rapper, singer, and model (Blackpink)
- January 17 – Alma, Finnish singer, songwriter, music producer, musician and activist
- January 23 – Chachi Gonzales, American actress and dancer
- January 25 - Calum Hood, Australian musician and singer (5 Seconds of Summer).
- January 27 – Braeden Lemasters, American actor, musician, voice actor, and singer (Wallows)
- January 28 – Emily Piriz, American singer
- January 31 – Master KG, South African DJ, singer and record producer
- February 1 – Doyoung, South Korean singer (NCT)
- February 2 – Remi Wolf, American singer-songwriter
- February 3 – Rhap Salazar, Filipino singer-songwriter and actor
- February 5 – Fireboy DML, Nigerian singer
- February 6 – Dalton Rapattoni, American singer
- February 8 – Joichiro Fujiwara, Japanese singer (Naniwa Danshi)
- February 9
  - Chungha, South Korean singer
  - Kelli Berglund, American actress, singer and dancer
- February 19
  - Mabel, Spanish-born Swedish-British singer-songwriter and activist
  - Ashnikko, American singer, songwriter, rapper and activist
- February 24 – Cristian Imparato, Italian singer
- February 27 – Ten, Thai singer and dancer (WayV)
- February 29 – Jony, Azerbaijani-Russian singer
- March 2 - Reve (singer), Canadian singer-songwriter
- March 3 – Jeremy Zucker, American singer
- March 12 – Aristo Sham, Hong Kong classical pianist
- March 17 – Tokischa, Dominican rapper, internet entertainer, and performance artist (Close with Madonna)
- March 24 – Jack Edward Johnson, pop rap musician in duo Jack & Jack
- March 26
  - Kathryn Bernardo, Filipina singer and actress
  - Fredo Bang, American rapper
- April 2 – Zach Bryan, American singer-songwriter, activist, and USA Navy veteran
- April 3 – Sarah Jeffery Canadian actress, dancer and singer
- April 4 – Austin Mahone, American singer
- April 5 – Mura Masa, a Guernsey-born electronic music producer, songwriter and multi-instrumentalist
- April 10 – Loïc Nottet, Belgian singer
- April 11 – Summer Walker, American singer-songwriter
- April 14 – Abigail Breslin, American singer and actress
- April 18
  - Clau, Brazilian singer
  - Ski Mask the Slump God, American rapper and songwriter
- April 19 – Sam Woolf, American singer
- May 1 – Mahalia (singer), British singer, songwriter and actress
- May 5 – Jax (singer), American singer-songwriter
- May 6 – Ocasional Talento, Bolivian rapper (d. 2025)
- May 9 – 6ix9ine, American rapper
- May 10 – Pressa, Canadian rapper
- May 14
  - Martin Garrix – Dutch DJ and record producer
  - Cole Bennett, American music video director and videographer
- May 15 – Birdy (singer), English musician, singer and songwriter
- May 16 – Baby Tate (rapper), American rapper, singer, and record producer
- May 19 - BlocBoy JB, American rapper and songwriter
- May 31 – Normani Kordei, American singer, songwriter and dancer (Fifth Harmony)
- June 2 – Morissette, Filipino singer and songwriter
- June 4 – Skip Marley, Jamaican singer (son of Cedella Marley and David Minto)
- June 7 – Shane Eagle, South African rapper and songwriter
- June 10 – Wen Junhui, Chinese singer, dancer, and actor (Seventeen)
- June 15
  - Aurora, Norwegian singer-songwriter and producer
  - Hoshi, South Korean singer and dancer (Seventeen)
- June 19 – Priscilla Alcantara, Brazilian singer
- June 25 – Lele Pons, Venezuelan-American internet personality, actress, singer, dancer and host
- June 27 – Lauren Jauregui, American singer, songwriter and dancer (Fifth Harmony)
- July 2 – Beret, Spanish pop singer
- July 11 – Alessia Cara, Canadian singer-songwriter
- July 13 – Jena Irene, American singer-songwriter
- July 16
  - Kevin Abstract, American rapper, singer and songwriter (Brockhampton)
  - Chayce Beckham, American singer
  - Luke Hemmings, Australian singer-songwriter and musician (5 Seconds of Summer)
  - Marthe De Pillecyn, Belgian singer and actress members of (K3)
- July 17 – Wonwoo, South Korean rapper and singer (Seventeen)
- July 18 – Yung Lean, Swedish rapper, singer, songwriter, record producer, and fashion designer
- July 23
  - Danielle Bradbery, American country pop singer
  - Klava Koka, Russian singer
- August 1
  - Cymphonique Miller, American actress and singer
  - Ellona Santiago, Filipino-American singer
- August 8 – Phoebus Ng, Hong Kong singer and actor (P1X3L)
- August 19 - Katja Glieson, an Australian-German singer
- September 1 – Zendaya, American actress, singer and dancer
- September 3 – Joy, South Korean singer, actress and host
- September 5 – Sigrid, Norwegian singer-songwriter
- September 6 – Lil Xan, American rapper
- September 10 – Jack Finnegan Gilinsky, pop rap musician in duo Jack & Jack
- September 11 – Swarmz, British Rapper
- September 16 - Baka Prase, Serbian rapper, YouTuber, internet personality, actor and entertainer
- September 17 – Slayyyter, American musician
- September 19
  - Pia Mia, Guamanian singer, songwriter and model
  - Sabrina Claudio. American singer and songwriter
- September 26 – Marina Sena, Brazilian singer
- September 27 – Mk.gee, American singer-songwriter, music producer, and multi-instrumentalist
- October 1 – Shenseea, Jamaican dancehall reggae performer and deejay
- October 7 – Lewis Capaldi, Scottish comedian, singer-songwriter, musician and activist
- October 10 – Oscar Zia, Swedish singer-songwriter
- October 14
  - Lourdes Leon, (Lourdes Maria Ciccone Leon), American fashion model, dancer and singer. (first child of Madonna) (As of August 2022, Leon began releasing her music under the moniker Lolahol.)
  - Madison Cunningham, American singer, songwriter and guitarist.
- October 15 – Zelo, South Korean rapper
- October 29
  - Emilia Mernes, Argentine singer
  - Astrid S, Norwegian singer-songwriter-model
- October 30 – Mizuki Fukumura, Japanese actress and singer (Morning Musume)
- November 1
  - Lil Peep, American rapper (d. 2017)
  - Jeongyeon, South Korean singer (TWICE)
- November 6 – Stefanie Scott, American actress and singer
- November 7 – Lorde, New Zealand singer-songwriter
- November 9 – Momo Hirai, Japanese singer and dancer (TWICE)
- November 19 – RiceGum, American YouTube personality, comedian and musician.
- November 23 – Lia Marie Johnson, American actress, singer, and Internet personality
- December 1 – MC Cheung Tin-fu, Hong Kong singer and actor
- November 6 - Talia Mar, English singer-songwriter and internet personality
- December 9 – AleXa, Korean-American singer.
- December 11
  - Hailee Steinfeld, American actress and singer-songwriter
  - Clementine Creevy, American singer-songwriter, actor, musician and model
- December 12
  - Gabi Martins, Brazilian singer and songwriter
  - Samia (musician), American musician, singer-songwriter and actress
- December 17 – Kungs, French DJ, record producer and musician
- December 29
  - Dylan Minnette, American actor, musician and singer (Wallows)
  - Sana Minatozaki, Japanese singer and dancer (TWICE)
- December 30 - Stephanie Del Valle, a Puerto Rican musician, model and beauty queen
- Unknown:
  - Alaska Reid, American singer-songwriter and producer
  - Dora Jar, American bedroom pop musician

== Deaths ==
- January 20 – Gerry Mulligan, saxophonist, 68
- January 21 – the London Boys:
  - Edem Ephraim, 36
  - Dennis Fuller, 36
- January 25 – Jonathan Larson, composer and writer of the hit Broadway musical Rent, 35 (aortic aneurysm)
- January 26 – Henry Lewis, American bassist and conductor, 63 (heart attack)
- January 30 – Bob Thiele, record producer, 73
- February 2 – Gene Kelly, actor and dancer, 83
- February 3 – Audrey Meadows, American actress and singer, 73
- February 7 – Boris Tchaikovsky, composer, 70
- February 15 – Wild Jimmy Spruill, guitarist, 61
- February 16 – Brownie McGhee, blues singer and guitarist, 80
- February 17 – Evelyn Laye, English actress and singer, 95
- February 20 – Toru Takemitsu, composer, 65
- February 21 – Morton Gould, composer, conductor, arranger and ASCAP President, 82
- February 26 – Mieczysław Weinberg, composer, 76
- March 4 – Minnie Pearl, comedian and country musician, 83
- March 15 – Olga Rudge, violinist, 101
- March 22 – Don Murray, drummer (The Turtles), 50 (post-operative complications)
- March 31 – Jeffrey Lee Pierce, singer and songwriter (The Gun Club), 37
- April 2 – Booba Barnes, blues singer and guitarist, 59 (cancer)
- April 18 – Bernard Edwards (Chic), 43 (pneumonia)
- May 8 – Celedonio Romero, leader of the Romeros guitar quartet, 83
- May 10 – Ethel Smith, organist, 93
- May 11 – Walter Hyatt, singer-songwriter, 46
- May 17
  - Kevin Gilbert, studio engineer, songwriter with Toy Matinee, Tuesday Night Music Club, 29 (asphyxiation)
  - Johnny "Guitar" Watson – guitarist, 61 (myocardial infarction)
- May 25 – Brad Nowell, lead singer and guitarist of Sublime, 28 (heroin overdose)
- May 30 – John Kahn, rock bassist, 48
- June 15 – Ella Fitzgerald, jazz singer, 79
- June 20 – Jim Ellison, singer and guitarist of Material Issue, 32
- July 12 – Jonathan Melvoin, touring keyboardist for The Smashing Pumpkins, 34 (heroin overdose)
- July 16 – John Panozzo, drummer for Styx and brother of Chuck Panozzo, 47
- July 17
  - Chas Chandler (The Animals), 57 (heart attack)
  - Marcel Dadi, French country and western guitarist, 44 (in the crash of TWA Flight 800)
- July 22 – Rob Collins, original keyboardist of The Charlatans, 33
- July 29 – Jason Thirsk, Pennywise bassist, 28 (suicide)
- August 11 – Mel Taylor, drummer (The Ventures), 62 (cancer)
- August 13 – David Tudor, pianist and composer, 70
- August 14
  - Sergiu Celibidache, Romanian conductor, 84
  - Al Cleveland, songwriter and producer, 66 (heart disease)
- August 16 – Miles Goodman, American film and television score composer, 47
- August 23 – Jurriaan Andriessen, Dutch composer, 71
- September 1 – Vagn Holmboe, Danish composer, 83
- September 9 – Bill Monroe, bluegrass singer, composer, and mandolin player, 84
- September 12 – Eleazar de Carvalho, Brazilian orchestral conductor and composer, 84
- September 13 – Tupac Shakur, rapper, poet, actor, 25 (shot)
- September 28 – Bob Gibson, folk singer/songwriter, 64
- October 2 – Joonas Kokkonen, Finnish composer, 75
- October 6 – Ted Daffan, country musician, 84
- October 11 – Renato Russo, lead singer and composer for Legião Urbana, 36
- October 17
  - Berthold Goldschmidt, German composer, 93
  - Chris Acland, Lush drummer, 30 (suicide)
- November 2 – Eva Cassidy, American vocalist, 33 (skin cancer)
- November 5 – Eddie Harris, jazz saxophonist, pianist and organist, 62
- November 10 – Manik Varma, Indian classical musician, 76
- November 13 – Bill Doggett, jazz and R&B pianist and organist, 80 (heart attack)
- November 30 – Tiny Tim, musician, 64
- December 5 – Wilf Carter, Canadian country musician, 91
- December 10 – Faron Young, country singer, 64
- December 15 – Dave Kaye, British pianist, 90
- December 29
  - Mireille, French singer, 90
  - Jerry Knight, vocalist, bassist, songwriter and producer, 44

== Awards ==
- 1996 Country Music Association Awards
- Eurovision Song Contest 1996
- Grammy Awards of 1996
- American Music Awards of 1996
- 1996 MTV Video Music Awards
- 1996 MTV Europe Music Awards
- Brit Awards 1996
- Mercury Music Prize, awarded to Different Class, the album by Pulp.
- Rock and Roll Hall of Fame inductees: David Bowie, Gladys Knight and the Pips, Jefferson Airplane, Little Willie John, Pink Floyd, The Shirelles and The Velvet Underground.
- Glenn Gould Prize: Toru Takemitsu (laureate); Tan Dun (protégé)

== Charts ==
- Billboard Year-End Hot 100 singles of 1996
- List of Billboard Hot 100 number ones of 1996
- List of number-one R&B singles of 1996 (U.S.)
- 1996 in British music#Charts
- List of Oricon number-one singles of 1996
- List of number-one singles of 1996 (Canada)

== See also ==
- 1996 in music (UK)
- Category:Record labels established in 1996
- Triple J Hottest 100, 1996
