= And Finally =

And Finally may refer to

- ...And Finally, a 2000 album by Northern Irish rock band Scheer
- And Finally (book), a 2022 memoir by Henry Marsh
- And Finally with Trevor McDonald, a 2021 documentary series hosted by Trevor McDonald
