= 1996 in South Korean music =

The following is a list of notable events and releases that happened in 1996 in music in South Korea.

== Debuting and disbanded in 1996 ==
=== Debuting ===
- Clon
- Goofy
- H.O.T.
- Onnine Ibalgwan
- Young Turks Club

=== Solo debuts ===
- Kim Ja-ok
- Lee Ji-hoon
- Sohyang
- Yangpa
- Lee Ki-chan
- Yoo Chae-yeong

=== Disbanded groups ===
- Koreana
- Seo Taiji and Boys
- Sobangcha
- Two Two

== Releases in 1996 ==
=== January ===
Date	Title	Artist	Genre(s)
1	쾌속(快速)	Yoo Chae-yeong	Ballad, Dance
1	DJ2DOC (D際2德)	DJ DOC	Hip hop

=== February ===
Date	Title	Artist	Genre(s)

=== March ===
Date	Title	Artist	Genre(s)
1	Youheeyeol	Toy	Electronica

=== April ===
Date	Title	Artist	Genre(s)
1	Light Camera Action!	Solid	K-pop, R&B, Hip hop

=== May ===
Date	Title	Artist	Genre(s)
1	Are You Ready?	Clon	Dance music
10	Because I'm Not With You	Im Chang-jung	K-pop
17	Exchange	Kim Gun-mo	K-pop

=== June ===
Date	Title	Artist	Genre(s)
15	All Systems Go	Roo'ra	K-pop, hip hop, pop, reggae, reggae fusion

=== July ===
Date	Title	Artist	Genre(s)
1	IT`s The Time	Park Jin-young	K-pop
7	Summer	DJ DOC	K-pop, Hip hop

=== August ===
Date	Title	Artist	Genre(s)
1	Banana Shake	SSAW	Jazz-rock fusion
1	영턱스 클럽	Young Turks Club	K-pop

=== September ===
Date	Title	Artist	Genre(s)
7	We Hate All Kinds of Violence	H.O.T.	K-pop, Dance, Hip hop
13	The Bridge of Sonic Heaven	Lee Seung-chul	Soft rock, Ballad
20	Pops & Party	Roo'ra	K-pop, hip hop, pop, reggae, reggae fusion

=== October ===
Date	Title	Artist	Genre(s)
5	Blue Rhythm	Yoo Young-jin	K-pop

=== November ===
Date	Title	Artist	Genre(s)
1	Destined the Best	Cool	K-pop, Dance-pop
1	Novice's Love (애송이의 사랑)	Yangpa	R&B, Ballad
1	Princess is Lonely	Kim Ja-ok	Trot
8	The Pigeon is the Sky's Rat	Onnine Ibalgwan	Rock
11	Goofy 1st (A lot and more)	Goofy	K-pop
25	Rhythm Paradise	Lee Ji-hoon	—N/a

=== December ===
Date	Title	Artist	Genre(s)
1	Reminiscences	Onnine Ibalgwan	Rock
27	Na Na Na Na Nineteen	Lee Ki-chan	R&B

== Deaths ==
- Kim Kwang-seok, aged 31. Singer, former member of Dongmulwon.
