= Music of My Life =

Studio album by Jo Stafford
- Released: January 12, 1996
- Genre: Traditional pop
- Label: Corinthian

Music of My Life is a 1996 compilation album by Jo Stafford.

== Track listing ==
1. "The Night We Called It a Day"
2. "Georgia on My Mind"
3. "Day by Day"
4. "Candy"
5. "If It Takes Me All My Life"
6. "The One I Love (Belongs to Somebody Else)"
7. "I'll Never Smile Again"
8. "Tennessee Waltz"
9. "On the Alamo"
10. "Sunday Kind of Love"
11. "All the Things You Are"
12. "What'cha Know Joe?"
