= The English Surgeon =

2007 British documentary film

- DVD cover image
- Directed by: Geoffrey Smith
- Produced by: Geoffrey Smith
- Starring: Henry Marsh, Igor Petrovich Kurilets
- Edited by: Kathy O'Shea
- Music by: Nick Cave; Warren Ellis
- Release date: 1 October 2007
- Running time: 93 minutes
- Country: United Kingdom
- Language: English

The English Surgeon is a documentary film that premiered at the BFI London Film Festival in 2007. It focuses on the work of Henry Marsh, a neurosurgeon from the UK, and his efforts to help desperately ill patients in Ukrainian hospitals.

== Background ==
Henry Marsh first went to Kyiv, Ukraine in 1992 to give lectures, and was appalled when he saw the medical system there. He states he was treating patients with medical complications that had not been seen in the United Kingdom for more than 60 or 70 years. When he offered his help, he was told that it would be nothing more than “a drop of water in the ocean” unless he changed the whole health care system. Deciding to do what he could, he started to train local doctors in surgical procedures, bringing equipment from the UK and performing surgery without charge. Alongside Ukrainian colleague Dr Igor Kurilets, he treated many patients who had been told they had no hope of survival, despite the political issues that arose.

== Plot ==
The film was shot in a Ukrainian hospital full of desperate patients and makeshift equipment, but it is not a medical film—it is about Henry Marsh, his partnership with Ukrainian colleague Igor Petrovich Kurilets, and their struggle with moral, ethical and professional issues.

Marsh is an English specialist neurosurgeon who operates on the brain using only local anaesthetic so that patients remain conscious and can provide feedback during the procedure. Marsh emphasises how hospital environment and design affect patient outcomes, and how having only single rooms in hospitals reduces infection and allows patients to have peace, rest, and quiet in order to make a full recovery.

With a soundtrack composed and performed by Nick Cave and Warren Ellis, the film is set in a bleak Ukrainian landscape as the doctors struggle against logistical odds and the old Soviet health system.

Kurilets faced death threats from opponents as he attempted to improve the local health care system. He would sleep in a different room every night and was fired numerous times. In spite of the obstacles, the doctors manage to save numerous lives.

Many of the patients whose brain scans they review have been diagnosed far too late due to medical costs and lack of equipment in Ukraine. This leads to the dilemma that is highlighted multiple times: would performing surgery do more harm than good? Marsh compares the position to a game of Russian roulette played with two revolvers. The documentary shows the interactions between the doctors as they are forced to tell patients that they are terminally ill and do not have much longer to live.

The documentary focuses on the treatment of one specific patient, Marian. He was tending his garden when he suddenly felt himself become numb from head to toe, and unable to talk or even scream. After multiple hospital visits, it is revealed that Marian has a tumour which is causing epilepsy. However, surgery is a significant risk because it could lead to complete paralysis of one side of his body. Marsh proposes that he should remove the tumour while Marian is awake, using a technique known as brain mapping. This allows him to observe Marian's reactions throughout the procedure and ensure that he does not lose his speech or motor function. Marian makes a full recovery.

A significant theme of the documentary is that Ukraine lacks the proper equipment to diagnose and treat their patients, one issue being the lack of perforators (surgical drills commonly used in craniotomies). Marsh states that in the UK these drills are used once and thrown away, but that with proper sanitation they are actually reusable. He brought in used perforators, and Kurilets worked to find a way to sanitize and replace the rubber coverings so that they could be reused.

Marsh discusses the story of Tanya. She was a child who had a tumour causing half her face to be paralysed. In Marsh's opinion the tumour was potentially curable, and he brought her back to London for surgery. However, complications arose. In a first operation, Tanya lost her circulating blood volume twice over, and after a second operation she became paralysed. She died two years later. Henry's emotional journey takes him to visit the mother and family of Tanya at the end of the film, as he had never stopped thinking about her or her family.

== Reception ==
- “Henry Marsh is a British brain surgeon whose humanity and talent with power drills make him an uncommonly enthralling linchpin” - Manohla Dargis, New York Times
- "Like Marsh, the filmmaker has taken a sort of triage approach to telling the tale, with near-perfect pacing as he moves between Marsh, the patients, and Marsh's wonderful Ukrainian colleague, neurosurgeon Igor Kurilets." - Betsy Sharkey, Los Angeles Times

On review aggregator website Rotten Tomatoes, the film holds an approval rating of 89% based on 19 reviews, with an average rating of 7.7/10.

== Awards and nominations ==
- SilverDocs Sterling World Feature Award (2008)
- News & Documentary Emmy Award for Outstanding Science and Technology Programming (2010)
- Hot Docs Canadian International Documentary Festival - Best International Feature Documentary (2008)
