= Infliction =

Studio album by Scheer
- Released: 28 May 1996
- Genre: Alternative metal
- Length: 44:39
- Label: 4AD
- Producer: Head; Scheer

Scheer chronology
Shéa EP (1996)	Infliction (1996)	Wish You Were Dead EP (1996)

Infliction is the debut studio album by Northern Irish rock band Scheer. It was released on 28 May 1996 through 4AD record label. The album became a minor alternative hit following the release of the singles "Shéa" and "Wish You Were Dead".

The record features an alternative metal sound with influences from power pop and shoegaze.

== Critical reception ==
Professional ratings
Review scores
Source	Rating
AllMusic	3/5 stars
Entertainment Weekly	B−

AllMusic critic Jonathan Lewis described the record as "a promising but inconsistent debut" and stated: "The problem Scheer encounter is not being able to make the songs different enough or to keep the vocals from sounding exposed." Anya Sacharow of Entertainment Weekly stated that the frontwoman Audrey Gallagher’s "airy, Bjorkian vocals contrast nicely with the mostly metal guitar on Infliction, despite "occasionally lapsing into a monotonous drone". Sacharow also regarded the record as "both hard and pretty — as if you morphed Hole with the Cocteau Twins."

Brad Reno of Trouser Press wrote: "The band kicks up an okay racket and Audrey Gallagher is certainly a strong vocalist, but the material is not desperately memorable." CMJ's Aaron Clow thought that the record showcases the band's technical prowess without overshadowing their songwriting. Clow further stated: "The band lives up to its name in a few ways — it's fuzzy and velvety, but watch out for that bed of nails lurking underneath."

== Track listing ==
All tracks are written by Scheer, except where noted.

1. "Shéa" — 2:21
2. "Howling Boy" — 4:02
3. "Wish You Were Dead" — 3:15
4. "In Your Hand" — 6:33
5. "Demon" — 4:48
6. "Babysize" — 6:03
7. "Sad Loved Girl" — 4:12
8. "Driven" — 3:21
9. "Screaming" — 4:02
10. "Goodbye" (Gallagher, Calderwood, Fleming) — 5:37

== Personnel ==
Album personnel as adapted from the album liner notes.

Scheer

- Audrey Gallagher — vocals
- Neal Calderwood — guitar
- Paddy Leyden — guitar
- Peter Fleming — bass guitar
- Joe Bates — drums

Other personnel

- Audrey Riley — cello (10)
- Scheer — production
- Head — production
- Ted Jensen — mastering
- Mike "Spike" Drake — mixing
- Steve Cook — assistant mixing
- Timothy O'Donnell — art direction, design
- Vaughan Oliver — art direction, design
- Nicola Schwartz — photography

== Chart position ==
Album

Charts (1996)	Peak position
UK Albums Chart	83
