= Clau =

Brazilian singer and songwriter

- Born: Ana Cláudia Scheffer Riffel; April 18, 1996 (age 30); Passo Fundo, Rio Grande do Sul, Brazil
- Genres: R&B; Pop; Rap
- Occupations: Singer, songwriter
- Instrument: Vocal
- Years active: 2016–present
- Label: Universal Music

Ana Cláudia Scheffer Riffel (born April 18, 1996), known by her stage name Clau, is a Brazilian singer and songwriter. She was signed to Universal Music after her popular online performances got her noticed. Her single Relaxa reached 1 million views on YouTube in less than 2 days. Clau is managed by the also Brazilian singer Anitta.

== Discography ==
=== EP ===
- #Relaxa (2018)

== Awards and nominations ==
Award	Year	Category	Nominee	Result	Ref.
MTV MIAW	2018	Presta Atenção	Clau	Nominated	
Meus Prêmios Nick	2018	Musical Revelation	Herself	Nominated	
MTV MIAW	2019	Feat. of the Year	"Pouca Pausa" — Clau feat. CortesiaDaCasa & Haikaiss	Nominated	
