= Hubert Kah (album) =

Studio album by Hubert Kah
- Released: 28 October 1996
- Length: 38:09
- Label: Polydor
- Producer: Armand Volker

Hubert Kah chronology
Sound of My Heart (1989)	Hubert Kah (1996)	Seelentaucher (2005)

Singles from Hubert Kah
- 1. "C'est La Vie" Released: 1995 and 1996 (Germany), 1997 (US); 2. "Sailing" Released: 1997

Hubert Kah is the sixth studio album by Hubert Kah, released by Polydor in 1996.

== Background ==
Hubert Kah was Hubert Kemmler's first album of new material since the release of Hubert Kah's album Sound of My Heart in 1989. At the time of the release of Sound of My Heart, Kemmler felt indifferent to the musical direction he had adopted, including his collaborative work with producer Michael Cretu. He decided to withdraw from the music industry by disbanding Hubert Kah and ending his collaboration with Cretu. During the same period, Kemmler also suffered from a mental breakdown and depression. He subsequently travelled, read Hermann Hesse, studied King Ludwig II of Bavaria and listened to the works of Richard Wagner.

Having discovered a love for the music and artistic personalities of the 19th century, Kemmler returned to writing and recording music, in which he tried to find a musical style that "has nothing to do with the zeitgeist [but] is still modern". The majority of the music on Hubert Kah, which was written by Kemmler and fellow German composer Dietmar Kawohl, attempted to merge pop and classical music. Many of the lyrics were written by Kemmler's then-wife, Susanne Kemmler. When work on his new music exceeded the budget provided by Polydor, Kemmler spent over 1 million Deutsche Mark of his own money on the recording of Hubert Kah.

Speaking of the album, Kemmler told Focus in 1995: "With my new record I have to tell about the way out of the darkness and narrowness and about hope. I can show that there is still emotion, romance and warmth." Many of the album's songs relate to Kemmler's personal struggles, including "Sailing (Away from Me)", "I Came to You (Oriental Moon)" and "Fortress Around My Heart". "Prélude Pour Mme S." was inspired by Kemmler's "deep love for [his] wife". The lyrical message of "C'est La Vie" relates to "trust[ing] your heart". "Prélude Pour Mme S." is adapted from Frédéric Chopin's "Prelude, Op. 28, No. 4". The instrumental "Only Dreaming" includes the tune of "Song to the Evening Star" by Wagner, played by a music box.

== Recording ==
Hubert Kah was recorded and mixed at Pilot Studios in Munich. The vocals were recorded at Village Recording Studio, Pilot Studios and Weryton Studios in Munich, and Atlantis Tonstudio in Reutlingen. The orchestral parts provided by the Vienna Symphony were recorded at Jugendstilsaal, Elisabethhöhe, Vienna. "Fortress Around My Heart" features strings recorded by the Munich Philharmonic at Bavaria Tonstudio in Munich. Kemmler had initially recorded more with the Munich Philharmonic but abandoned those recordings in favour of those by the Vienna Symphony.

A number of sounds were recorded on Kemmler's travels for use on the album. The grotto and waterfall sounds on "Schlaf Ein" were recorded at Linderhof Palace. "I Came to You (Oriental Moon)" contains prayer chants recorded by Kemmler during his time in Oman and the United Arab Emirates. Kemmler also recorded at Hohenschwangau Castle in order the feature Wagner's own piano, played by Andi Slavik, on the album, owing to its "slightly out of tune sound that the composers of the romantic period also used and loved".

== Singles ==
"C'est La Vie" was released as the album's lead single in 1995 and again in 1996. The song's music video was directed by Anno Saul. "C'est La Vie" was later released as a promotional single by Curb in the United States in 1997. It had received 248 spins as of 7 November 1997 and was subsequently listed on the Gavin Report's "A/C Up and Coming" list. "Sailing" was released as the album's second and final single in 1997.

== Critical reception ==
Upon its release, Der Spiegel described the album as "deserving of all respect", with Kemmler singing of "fear, anger [and] isolation". They considered the album to "succeed in the 'connection between romantic classic and pop' that Kemmler has set himself the goal of".

== Track listing ==
No.	Title	Writer(s)	Length
1.	"Sailing (Away from Me)"	Hubert Kemmler, Dietmar Kawohl, Susanne Kemmler, Michael Kunze	4:47
2.	"I Came to You (Oriental Moon)"	H. Kemmler, Kawohl, S. Kemmler	4:37
3.	"Prélude Pour Mme S."	H. Kemmler, Andi Slavik, S. Kemmler	4:50
4.	"Flower in the Snow"	H. Kemmler, S. Kemmler	4:01
5.	"Only Dreaming"	H. Kemmler, Kawohl	1:03
6.	"C'est La Vie"	H. Kemmler, Kawohl, S. Kemmler	4:30
7.	"Fortress Around My Heart"	H. Kemmler, Kristian Schultze, Kawohl, S. Kemmler	3:10
8.	"Is This Love (Sweet Delusion)"	H. Kemmler, Kawohl, S. Kemmler	3:48
9.	"Schlaf Ein"	H. Kemmler, Markus Löhr, Kawohl, S. Kemmler	2:10
10.	"The End Is Near"	H. Kemmler, Kawohl, Armand Volker	1:01
11.	"Mountains and Sea"	H. Kemmler, Kawohl, S. Kemmler	4:08

== Personnel ==
- Hubert Kemmler – vocals, keyboards
- Kristian Schultze – keyboards, arranger, piano (track 7), orchestral transcription (track 4)
- Andi Slavik – keyboards, piano, musical director
- Hermann Weindorf – orchestral transcription (tracks 1–3, 5–11)
- Peter Weihe, Ozzy Schaller – guitars
- Walter Keiser – drum programming, live drums
- Eric Bond – drum programming
- Curt Cress – live drums
- Vienna Symphony – orchestral parts except on "Fortress Around My Heart"
- Claudius Traunfellner – conductor
- Marcus Trefny – solo cello
- Susanne Kemmler – female vocals (tracks 3, 6)
- Bavarian State Orchestra – male choir (track 4)
- Munich Philharmonic – strings (track 7)
- Sreten Krstič – violin (track 7)
- Rens Newland and Friends – guitar and brass section (track 7)
- Chris Thompson and Friends, London – gospel choir (track 8)
- Alex Catarinelli – sampling, sound library

Production

- Armand Volker – producer, arranger, drum programming, mixing

Other

- Michael Moesslang – graphic design
- Manuel Schoebl – illustrations, paintings
- Susanne Kemmler – photography
