= And Finally (book) =

2023 book by Henry Marsh

- Author: Henry Marsh
- Subjects: Neuroscience, death
- Publisher: Jonathan Cape, St. Martin's Press
- Publication date: 1 September 2022
- ISBN: 9781250286086

And Finally: Matters of Life and Death is a 2022 memoir by British neurosurgeon Henry Marsh, detailing his battle against prostate cancer. Marsh discusses his transition from doctor to patient, contemplates philosophical questions relating to death and the nature of the mind, and reflects on his life. And Finally was published by Jonathan Cape on 1 September 2022, and received positive reviews from critics.

== Publication history ==
And Finally was published in the United Kingdom by Jonathan Cape on 1 September 2022. It was published in the United States by St. Martin's Press on 17 January 2023.

== Reception ==
The Guardian's Colin Grant praised Marsh's candid discussion of death and described his prose as "plain-speaking without being dispassionate." Melanie Reid similarly praised Marsh's prose in The Times. Gillian Tindall wrote a positive review for The Times Literary Supplement in which she commented on Marsh's angst as reflected in his writing.

American publications commented similarly upon its stateside release. Kieran Setiya wrote a positive review for The New York Times Book Review, commenting positively on the narrative and appreciating that Marsh "does not pretend to answer metaphysical questions." The Washington Post's Abraham Verghese described the book as "thought-provoking" and a review in The Boston Globe praised Marsh's emotional language.

Positive reviews were published in Publishers Weekly and Kirkus Reviews, with the former describing Marsh's writing as "immersive" and the latter calling it a "fascinating account." Booklist's Tony Miksanek praised the memoir's structure and descriptions of dementia, and positive reviews were published in The Star Tribune and Air Mail.
