= Too Much Too Young: The Gold Collection =

Compilation album by The Specials
- Released: 13 May 1996
- Genre: 2 Tone, Ska
- Length: 52:53
- Label: EMI Gold

The Specials chronology
Coventry Automatics Aka the Specials: Dawning of a New Era (1994)	Too Much Too Young: The Gold Collection (1996)	Today's Specials (1996)

Professional ratings
Review scores
Source	Rating
Allmusic	link

Too Much Too Young: The Gold Collection is a compilation album by British Ska band The Specials. It features eight songs from their eponymous 1979 debut album Specials, along with seven songs from the subsequent More Specials album (1980), plus the track Rude Boys Outa Jail, originally only released as a double A-side single with Rat Race in 1980.

The compilation thus focuses on the earlier years of the group, only featuring recordings made by the original line-up before Neville Staples, Terry Hall and Lynval Golding left the band in 1981/1982. A notable omission is the group's second (and last) number one hit Ghost Town, released as a single in 1981, while Staples, Hall and Golding were still in the group.

== Track listing ==
No.	Title	Writer(s)	Length
1.	"Too Much Too Young"	Jerry Dammers, acknowledgment to Lloyd Charmers	6:05
2.	"Enjoy Yourself (It's Later Than You Think)"	Herb Magidson, Carl Sigman	3:36
3.	"Man at C&A"	Dammers, Terry Hall	3:36
4.	"Rude Boys Outa Jail"	Lynval Golding, Neville Staple	4:06
5.	"I Can't Stand It"	Dammers	4:04
6.	"Do The Dog"	Rufus Thomas, arr. by Dammers	2:09
7.	"Blank Expression"	Dammers, The Specials	2:42
8.	"(Dawning Of A) New Era" (listed as "(Dawning Of) A New Era")	Dammers	2:25
9.	"Monkey Man"	Toots Hibbert	2:45
10.	"Hey Little Rich Girl"	Roddy Byers	3:34
11.	"Pearl's Cafe"	Dammers	3:09
12.	"Little Bitch"	Dammers	2:32
13.	"Rat Race"	Byers	3:09
14.	"A Message to You, Rudy"	R. Thompson	2:52
15.	"Do Nothing"	Golding	3:41
16.	"You're Wondering Now"	Clement Seymour	2:37
