= Tucker's Town (song) =

1996 single by Hootie & the Blowfish

Single by Hootie & the Blowfish

from the album Fairweather Johnson
- B-side: "Araby"
- Released: June 25, 1996
- Length: 3:45
- Label: Atlantic
- Songwriters: Mark Bryan; Dean Felber; Darius Rucker; Jim "Soni" Sonefeld
- Producer: Don Gehman

Hootie & the Blowfish singles chronology
"Old Man & Me (When I Get To Heaven)" (1996)	"Tucker's Town" (1996)	"Sad Caper" (1996)

"Tucker's Town" is a song by American rock group Hootie & the Blowfish. It was released on June 25, 1996 by Atlantic Records, as the second single from their second album, Fairweather Johnson (1996). In the United States, it peaked at numbers 26 and 38 on the Cash Box Top 100 and Billboard Hot 100 charts (their last Hot 100 entry until 2025, until their collaboration with Scotty McCreery on "Bottle Rockets" brought them back to the Hot 100), and number seven on the Billboard Triple-A chart. Outside the US, "Tucker's Town" reached number two in Canada and number 20 in Iceland. The accompanying music video was directed by Greg Masuak.

== Content ==
The song is named for the village of Tucker's Town, Bermuda, the mostly black, working-class residents of which (including the future members of The Talbot Brothers band) were compelled to sell their land in the 1920s to make way for a hotel and golf club, and an enclave where foreign millionaires and billionaires are permitted to own homes. Bermuda, which is on the same latitude as South Carolina and from which Carolina Colony was colonised under William Sayle in 1670, was a frequent haunt of the South Carolinian band. However, the nearest landfall is Cape Hatteras in North Carolina.

== Track listings ==
- US 7-inch, CD, and cassette single
1. "Tucker's Town" – 3:46
2. "Araby" – 2:51
- German and Australian CD single
1. "Tucker's Town" – 3:46
2. "Araby" – 2:51
3. "Not Even the Trees" (live)
- UK CD single
1. "Tucker's Town"
2. "Araby"
3. "Not Even the Trees" (live)
4. "Hannah Jane" (live)

== Charts ==
=== Weekly charts ===
Chart (1996)	Peak position
Canada Top Singles (RPM)	2
Canada Adult Contemporary (RPM)	2
Iceland (Íslenski Listinn Topp 40)	20
Scottish Singles Sales (Official Charts)	92
UK Singles (Official Charts)	77
US Billboard Hot 100	38
US Adult Alternative Airplay (Billboard)	7
US Adult Contemporary (Billboard)	24
US Adult Pop Airplay (Billboard)	12
US Mainstream Rock Airplay (Billboard)	29
US Pop Airplay (Billboard)	15
US Cash Box Top 100	26

=== Year-end charts ===
Chart (1996)	Position
Canada Top Singles (RPM)	25
Canada Adult Contemporary (RPM)	44
US Adult Top 40 (Billboard)	37
US Top 40/Mainstream (Billboard)	67
US Triple A (Billboard)	29

== Release history ==
Region	Date	Format(s)	Label(s)	Ref.
United States	June 25, 1996	Contemporary hit radio	Atlantic	
United States	June 25, 1996	CD	Atlantic	
United Kingdom	July 15, 1996	CD	Atlantic	
