= Chalk FarM =

American alternative rock band

- Origin: Los Angeles, California, U.S.
- Genre: Alternative rock
- Years active: 1992–2000, 2010–present
- Labels: Columbia Records; TIC Records
- Members: Michael Duff; Toby Scarbrough; Trace Ritter
- Past members: Rob Ahlers; Orlando Sims
- Website: http://www.chalkfarm.com

Chalk FarM is an alternative rock band from Los Angeles.

== Overview ==
=== Original years ===
The band released two albums in the late 1990s and are best known for their song "Lie On Lie", which was played for a short time on MTV in late 1996 and received radio airplay in the United States nationwide. Despite critical approval and a cult following, their debut album did not sell well, and the band was dropped from major label Columbia Records soon thereafter. The band broke up in 2000.

Among the musicians the group opened for were Joe Walsh and Seal. Chalk farM also appear as the band playing at the conclusion of the film Coyote Ugly.

=== Reunion ===
According to Chalk farM's Facebook page, the four original members are back together, playing regularly in the Los Angeles area, and are "recording a new record."

On February 21, 2014, Orlando Sims died after a lengthy battle with cancer.

Dan Lavery from Tonic filled in place for Sims after his death as a touring member.

== Discography ==
Studio albums

- Notwithstanding (1996, Columbia Records)
- Three 2s (2000, TIC Records)
- Into the Night (2012, Chalk FarM Music)

Extended plays

- April E.P. (2011, Chalk FarM Music)
- October E.P. (2011, Chalk FarM Music)

=== Singles ===
Year	Title	Chart positions		Album
Year	Title	US Modern Rock	US Mainstream Rock	Album
1996	"Lie On Lie"	36	13	Notwithstanding
1997	"Live Tomorrow"	—	35	Notwithstanding

== Members ==
- Michael Duff (Vocals, guitar)
- Toby Scarbrough (Drums, vocals)
- Trace Ritter (guitar, vocals)
- Dan Lavery (Bass guitar) (2016 as guest musician)

=== Past members ===
- Orlando Sims (vocals, bass) (died 2014)
- Rob Ahlers (drums) (2000)
