= Henry Marsh (neurosurgeon) =

English neurosurgeon (born 1950)

Henry Marsh CBE FRCS
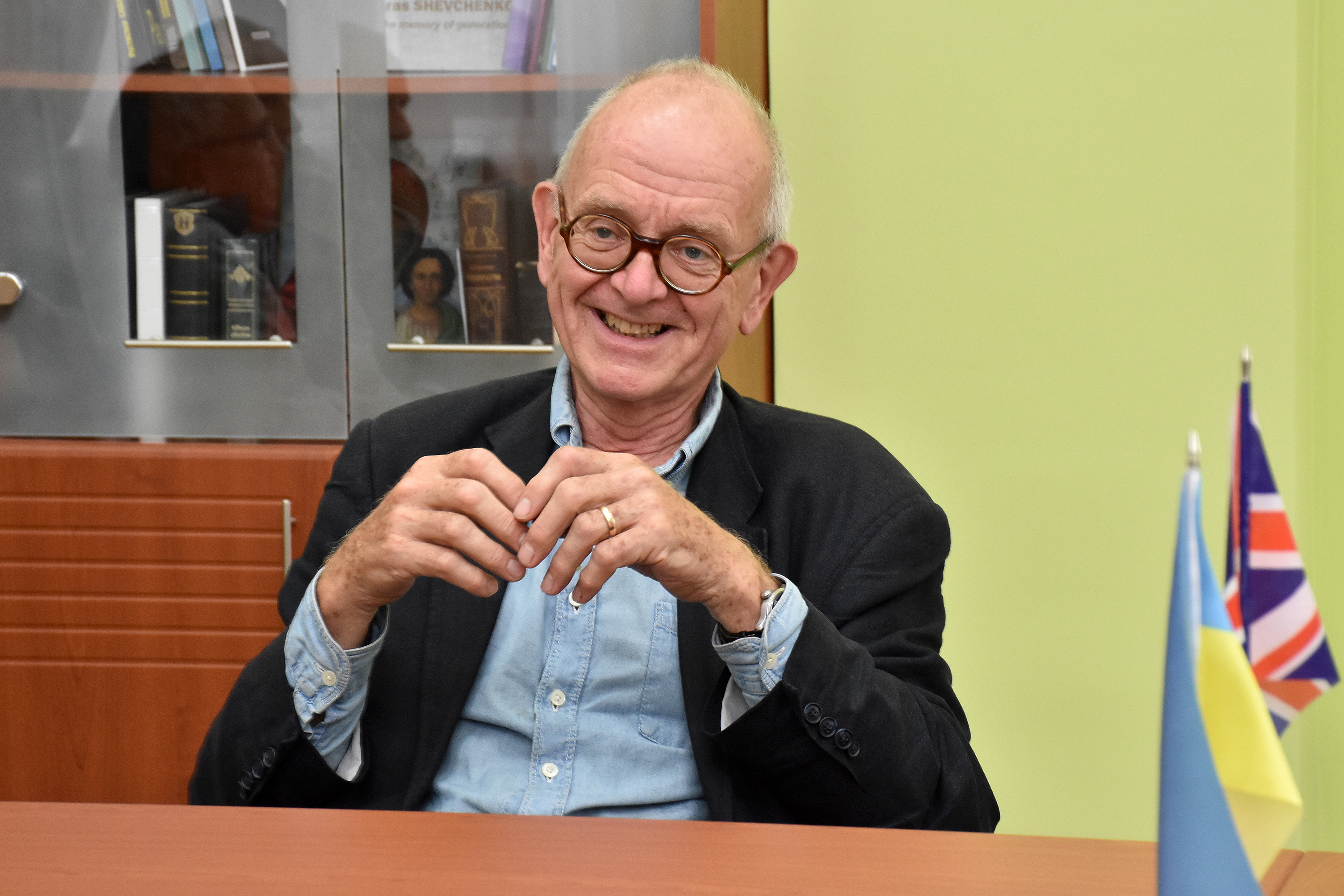
- Born: 5 March 1950 (age 76); Oxford, Oxfordshire, U.K.
- Education: University College, Oxford; Royal Free Hospital School of Medicine
- Known for: awake craniotomy techniques and neurosurgical work in Ukraine.
- Spouse: Kate Fox
- Scientific career
- Fields: Neurosurgery

Henry Thomas Marsh (born 5 March 1950) is a British neurosurgeon and author, a pioneer of awake craniotomy techniques and of neurosurgical work in Ukraine.

== Early life ==
Marsh is the youngest of his parents' four children. His parents were the law reformer Norman Stayner Marsh (1913–2008) and bookseller Christiane "Christel" Christinnecke (1917–2000). His mother relocated from Halle in Germany to England in 1939 after she had been denounced to the Gestapo for "making anti-Nazi comments". They married in London in the late summer of 1939. They played a leading role in the creation of the human rights organisation Amnesty International, the brainchild of the lawyer and activist Peter Benenson.

Marsh was born in 1950, in Oxford, where his father taught law at the University of Oxford. Marsh attended the Dragon School. The family later moved to London and he studied at Westminster School, before returning to Oxford, to read Politics, Philosophy and Economics at University College, Oxford, where he obtained First Class Honours, before graduating with Honours in Medicine from the Royal Free Medical School. Fragile mental health left Marsh considering suicide, and he took a year out, spending time as a voluntary patient, as well as working as a porter in a hospital.

== Career ==
Until 2015, Marsh was the senior consultant neurosurgeon at the Atkinson Morley Wing at St George's Hospital, south London, one of the country's largest specialist brain surgery units.

He specialised in operating on the brain under local anaesthetic and was the subject of a major BBC documentary Your Life in Their Hands in 2004, which won the Royal Television Society Gold Medal.

He has been working with neurosurgeons in the former Soviet Union, mainly in Ukraine since 1992 and his work there was the subject of the BBC Storyville film The English Surgeon from 2007. This won an Emmy award in 2010 for best science documentary.

=== Other work ===
He has a particular interest in the influence of hospital buildings and design on patient outcomes and staff morale; he has broadcast and lectured widely on this subject. He states that one of his proudest achievements has been the creation of a balcony garden outside the two neurosurgical wards at St. George's Hospital.

In 2023 he co-founded with Dr. Rachel Clarke the charity Hospice Ukraine, which aims to help palliative care doctors and nurses in Ukraine. He has been working with medical colleagues in Ukraine since 1992, and has continued to visit since the Russian invasion in February 2022.

=== Writing ===
His memoir Do No Harm: Stories of Life, Death and Brain Surgery was published in 2014. According to The Economist, this memoir is "so elegantly written it is little wonder some say that in Mr Marsh neurosurgery has found its Boswell". It has been translated into 37 languages.

In 2017, Marsh published Admissions: Life as a Brain Surgeon, a second memoir with Weidenfeld & Nicolson, an imprint of Orion. In 2022 he published And Finally with Jonathan Cape, in which he describes his transition from being a doctor to being a patient with cancer. Both books were Sunday Times best sellers.

He writes regularly for the New Statesman magazine and has written for The Guardian, the Financial Times, The Times, The New York Times, The Sunday Times and the online Ukrainian newspaper Ukrainska Pravda.

== Other Radio and television ==
Marsh was the castaway on BBC Radio 4's long-running Desert Island Discs in September 2018. His favourite selection was Better Not Look Down by B. B. King.

In August 2025 the BBC broadcast 'Confessions of a Brain Surgeon': "Henry Marsh reveals the truth about this high-risk job.

== Awards and honours ==
Marsh was appointed Commander of the Order of the British Empire (CBE) in the 2010 Birthday Honours. Also in 2010 he presented the Leslie Oliver Oration at Queen's Hospital.

== Personal life ==
Henry Marsh is married to the social anthropologist Kate Fox, author of the best-selling Watching the English, and spends his spare time making furniture and keeping bees. He is a younger brother of the architectural historian Bridget Cherry.

Marsh is a patron of Humanists UK. Marsh is also a Patron of My Death, My Decision, an organisation that campaigns for the legal right to a medically-assisted death in England and Wales.

In April 2021 it was announced that Marsh had been diagnosed with advanced prostate cancer, which as of August 2022 is now in remission. He has, in the meantime, continued to visit Ukraine since the 2022 Russian invasion to teach and advise local doctors.

== Publications ==
- Marsh, Henry (2014). Do No Harm: Stories of Life, Death and Brain Surgery. Weidenfeld & Nicolson. ISBN 9781780225920.
- Marsh, Henry (2017). Admissions: A Life in Brain Surgery. Weidenfeld & Nicolson. ISBN 9781474603867.
- Marsh, Henry (2022). And Finally: Matters of Life and Death. Jonathan Cape. ISBN 9781787331136.
