= Notwithstanding (album) =

Studio album by Chalk FarM
- Released: 1996
- Genre: Alternative rock
- Label: Columbia
- Producer: Matt Hyde

Chalk FarM chronology
Notwithstanding (1996)	Three 2s (2000)

Singles from Notwithstanding
- 1. "Lie on Lie" Released: 1996; 2. "Live Tomorrow" Released: 1997

Notwithstanding is the debut album by the American band Chalk FarM, released in 1996.

The singles "Lie on Lie" and "Live Tomorrow" charted on Billboard's Mainstream Rock chart, at No. 13 and No. 35, respectively. The band supported the album by touring with Better Than Ezra and Tonic, among others.

== Production ==
The album was produced by Matt Hyde, who recorded the band after hearing their 4-song demo. All four band members contributed to the songwriting, which often aspired to U2-esque songs about social problems and universal themes. The title of the album is a reference to the legal argot that kept appearing in Chalk FarM's recording contract. The album contains a hidden track, which begins three minutes after "Sunflower".

== Critical reception ==
Professional ratings
Review scores
Source	Rating
AllMusic	4/5 stars
MusicHound Rock: The Essential Album Guide	2/5 stars
St. Petersburg Times	C−

The Washington Post called "Lie on Lie" "a power ballad that uses Orlando Sims's stabbing bass line to build the tension released by the anthemic chorus." The St. Petersburg Times wrote that "Chalk FarM boldly goes where so many bands have gone before ... in this shiny happy realm of three-chord bliss, the time is always 4/4 and backup harmonies are sweet enough to rot your teeth." The Sun Herald considered the songs to be "essential progressive pop rock—usually medium- to up-tempo, always crystal clear."

The Los Angeles Daily News deemed the album "a solid effort that brings to mind the '60s-influenced songwriting and playing of Counting Crows and the Wallflowers." USA Today determined that the band "recalls the Gin Blossoms in their hook-writing skill and dreamy explorations of adult responsibility... The songs have pace and structure—beginnings, middles and endings." Tulsa World noted that "the homogenized trance of this music is ironic ... considering that most of Chalk Farm's lyrics focus on various Everypersons trying to resist apathy and acquiescence."

AllMusic called Notwithstanding "a cohesive, endearing album" with choruses that "are littered with instantly recognizable hooks." MusicHound Rock: The Essential Album Guide labeled it "mediocre, middle-of-the-road rock."

== Track listing ==
No.	Title	Length
1.	"Live Tomorrow"
2.	"Lesson"
3.	"Lie on Lie"
4.	"Hey"
5.	"Lose You Now"
6.	"When Something Becomes Nothing"
7.	"Don't Believe"
8.	"Wonder"
9.	"I'm Awake"
10.	"Lilly Anne"
11.	"It's Up to You"
12.	"The Girl Is Crying"
13.	"Sunflower"
14.	"Untitled"
