= ...And Finally =

Studio album by Scheer
- Released: 2000
- Genre: Rock
- Length: 52:27
- Label: Schism
- Producer: Clif Norrell; Neal Calderwood

Scheer chronology
Demon EP (1997)	...And Finally (2000)

...And Finally is the second and final studio album by Northern Irish rock band Scheer. It was released in 2000 through the band's own record label Schism Records, following the band's demise in 1998. The recording of the album started in 1997; nevertheless, its release was postponed indefinitely due to a contractual disagreement with 4AD record label.

== Critical reception ==
Professional ratings
Review scores
Source	Rating
AllMusic	3/5 stars
Kerrang!	3/5 stars

AllMusic critic Heather Phares thought that "stronger songwriting and clearer production of the record provide the focus and polish necessary to make Scheer's sound less forced." Phares further stated: "Though it grows somewhat repetitive toward the end, it's unfortunate that And Finally didn't receive the release it deserved, as it clearly shows Scheer's continued growth and potential."

== Track listing ==
All tracks are written by Scheer.

1. "Deadly Serious" — 3:22
2. "First Contact" — 3:51
3. "Face the Sun" — 3:35
4. "6am" — 2:18
5. "The One Forgot" — 3:56
6. "Say What You Came to Say" — 5:15
7. "The Healer" — 4:18
8. "Idle Time" — 3:26
9. "Mercy" — 3:38
10. "Slowly" — 3:48
11. "Suffocate" — 3:31
12. "Where Were You When the Home Burnt Down" — 4:19
13. "Secrets and Lies" — 3:50
14. "Say the Word" — 3:20

== Personnel ==
Album personnel as adapted from album liner notes.

Scheer

- Audrey Gallagher — vocals
- Neal Calderwood — guitar; engineering, mixing and production (13, 14)
- Paddy Leyden — guitar
- Peter Fleming — bass guitar, acoustic guitar
- Joe Bates — drums, percussion

Other personnel

- Clif Norrell — engineering, mixing and production (1—12)
