= Goofy (band) =

South Korean musical group

- Origin: South Korea
- Genres: K-pop, dance, hip hop
- Years active: 1996-present
- Members: Shin Dong-uk; Lee Seung-gwang; Park Seong-ho
- Past members: Choe Dong-min; J Me

Goofy (Korean: 구피) is a South Korean dance music and hip hop trio that debuted in 1996.

== Discography ==
=== Studio albums ===
Title	Album details	Peak chart positions	Sales
Title	Album details	KOR	Sales
Much More (많이많이)	Released: 11 November 1996; Label: LG Media, O.K Music; Formats: CD, cassette	No data	No data
Goofy II	Released: October 1998; Label: World Music Co, Best Media; Formats: CD, cassette	No data	No data
Goofy III	Released: May 1999; Label: YBM Seoul Records, Best Media; Formats: CD, cassette	—	—N/a
Technogoofy	Released: January 21, 2000; Label: Doremi Records; Formats: CD, cassette	21	KOR: 52,126+
No. 4	Released: December 11, 2000; Label: SM Entertainment, lkpop, CIA; Formats: CD, cassette	34	KOR: 16,177+
Goofy Story	Released: July 15, 2003; Formats: CD, cassette	—	—N/a
Youth (청춘)	Released: November 15, 2005; Formats: CD, cassette	—	—N/a
Charting and sales data not available before 1999. "—" denotes releases that did not chart.

=== Singles ===
- "Neo Goofy" (2008)
- "비야" (2009)
- "옛날 노래의 역습" (2016)
