= Scheer (band) =

Irish alt-metal band

- Scheer, 1996.

Background information
- Origin: Derry, Northern Ireland
- Genres: Alternative metal
- Years active: 1993–1998
- Labels: 4AD, Schism
- Past members: P J Doherty; Audrey Gallagher; Neal Calderwood; Paddy Leyden; Peter Fleming; Joe Bates

Scheer was an alternative metal band from County Londonderry, Northern Ireland. It was first founded by PJ 'Doc' Doherty and Paddy Leyden. The composition of the band was Paddy Leyden (Rhythm guitar), Audrey Gallagher (vocals), Neal Calderwood, (Lead guitar) Joe Bates (drummer) PJ Doherty (bass guitar) left before the band signed to 4AD and recorded their first album and was replaced by Peter Fleming (Bass guitar).

After spending a few months playing small venues around Ireland, the band were signed by the Irish record label SON, and released their debut single "Wish You Were Dead" in late 1993. There was a great deal of interest surrounding this release and Scheer followed it with the "Psychobabble EP" in 1994.

In April 1995, Scheer signed to the 4AD label and released the "Schism EP". In 1996 the band's debut album was ready for release, and this was preceded by the release of two singles: "Sheà" and a revamped "Wish You Were Dead". Infliction was released in 1996 to critical acclaim.

The recording of their second album began in 1997, but due to a contractual disagreement with 4AD, the release of the album was postponed indefinitely; the aptly titled ...And Finally appeared in mid-2000 on the band's own Schism Records label.

As all the members decided to continue with further solo projects, the group broke up in October 1998.

Audrey has continued to work in the music business as a successful trance vocalist Neal owns his own recording studio ManorPark Studios

== Discography ==
=== Studio albums ===
- Infliction (4AD CAD6006, 28 May 1996)
- ...And Finally (Schism Records SCH008, 2000)

=== Singles and EPs ===
- "Wish You Were Dead" single (Son Records BUA29, 1993)
- Schism EP (4AD BAD5012, 9 October 1995)
- Shéa EP (4AD BAD6003, 19 February 1996)
- Wish You Were Dead EP (4AD BAD6005, 15 April 1996)
- Demon EP (4AD BAD7006, 8 April 1997)
