= 18 Greatest Hits (Sandra album) =

1992 compilation by Sandra

Greatest hits album by Sandra
- Released: 12 October 1992
- Recorded: 1985–1992
- Genre: Pop
- Length: 71:45
- Label: Virgin
- Producers: Michael Cretu; Armand Volker

Sandra chronology
Close to Seven (1992)	18 Greatest Hits (1992)	Fading Shades (1995)

Alternative cover
- The Essential cover

Professional ratings
Review scores
Source	Rating
AllMusic	4.5/5 stars

18 Greatest Hits is the second greatest hits album by German singer Sandra, released on 12 October 1992 by Virgin Records.

== Background, Albums and Achievements ==
18 Greatest Hits consists of all Sandra singles released between 1985 and 1992, many of them in shorter 7″ versions, excluding her most recent single, "I Need Love". A new version of "Johnny Wanna Live" from the Paintings in Yellow album was also included and released as a single to promote the collection. A video version of the album was released on VHS, including all 18 music videos.

The compilation peaked at number 10 on the German chart, and has been certified gold in Germany and platinum in France. The album was re-released on 31 March 2003 under the title The Essential with a different artwork, but the same track listing.

== Track listing ==
All tracks are produced by Michael Cretu, except tracks 4, 5 and 7, produced by Cretu and Armand Volker.

No.	Title	Lyrics	Music	Length
1.	"Maria Magdalena"	Richard Palmer-James	Hubert Kemmler; Markus Löhr; Cretu	3:58
2.	"In the Heat of the Night"	Löhr; Klaus Hirschburger	Cretu; Kemmler	5:07
3.	"Little Girl"	Hirschburger	Kemmler; Löhr; Cretu	3:11
4.	"Innocent Love"	Susanne Müller; Hirschburger	Kemmler; Ulrich Herter	4:21
5.	"Hi! Hi! Hi!"	Cretu; Hirschburger	Cretu; Kemmler	4:08
6.	"Loreen"	Frank Peterson; Hirschburger	Peterson; Cretu	4:17
7.	"Midnight Man"	Kemmler; Hirschburger	Kemmler; Cretu	3:04
8.	"Everlasting Love"	Mac Gayden	James Cason	3:51
9.	"Stop for a Minute"	Hirschburger	Cretu	4:05
10.	"Heaven Can Wait"	Hirschburger; Kemmler	Cretu; Kemmler; Löhr	4:04
11.	"Secret Land"	Müller; Hirschburger; Michael Höing	Uwe Gronau; Kemmler; Cretu; Mats Björklund	4:05
12.	"We'll Be Together"	Kemmler; Löhr; Sandra	Hirschburger; Kemmler	3:49
13.	"Around My Heart"	Hirschburger; Kemmler	Kemmler; Löhr; Sör Otto's; Peterson	3:10
14.	"Hiroshima"	David Morgan	Morgan	4:11
15.	"(Life May Be) A Big Insanity"	Cretu; Hirschburger	Cretu	4:29
16.	"One More Night"	Cretu; Hirschburger	Cretu; Peterson	3:41
17.	"Don't Be Aggressive"	Hirschburger; Cretu	Cretu	4:22
18.	"Johnny Wanna Live"	Cretu; Hirschburger	Cretu; Peterson	3:52
Total length:				71:45

== Charts ==
1992–1993 chart performance for 18 Greatest Hits
Chart (1992–1993)	Peak position
Dutch Albums (Album Top 100)	81
European Albums (Music & Media)	29
Finnish Albums (Suomen virallinen lista)	1
German Albums (Offizielle Top 100)	10
Swedish Albums (Sverigetopplistan)	36
Swiss Albums (Schweizer Hitparade)	27

1996 chart performance for 18 Greatest Hits
Chart (1996)	Peak position
Belgian Albums (Ultratop Wallonia)	5

2005 chart performance for 18 Greatest Hits
Chart (2005)	Peak position
Polish Albums (ZPAV)	39

== Certifications ==
Certifications for 18 Greatest Hits
Region	Certification	Certified units/sales
France (SNEP)	Platinum	300,000^{*}
Germany (BVMI)	Gold	250,000^{^}
Poland (ZPAV)	Gold	20,000^{*}
^{*} Sales figures based on certification alone.^{^} Shipments figures based on certification alone.
