= Ten on One (The Singles) =

1987 greatest hits album by Sandra

Greatest hits album by Sandra
- Released: 15 October 1987
- Recorded: January 1985 – August 1987
- Studio: Data Alpha (Munich, West Germany)
- Genre: Synth-pop
- Length: 42:07
- Label: Virgin
- Producer: Michael Cretu; Armand Volker

Sandra chronology
Mirrors (1986)	Ten on One (The Singles) (1987)	Into a Secret Land (1988)

Singles from Ten on One (The Singles)
- 1. "Everlasting Love" Released: September 1987; 2. "Stop for a Minute" Released: 1988

Professional ratings
Review scores
Source	Rating
AllMusic	4/5 stars

Ten on One (The Singles) is the first greatest hits album by German singer Sandra, released on 15 October 1987 by Virgin Records. It was a commercial success and spawned one of Sandra's most successful singles, the cover of "Everlasting Love", originally recorded by Robert Knight.

== Overview ==
The compilation consists of three songs from Sandra's debut studio album The Long Play (1985), five from her second studio album Mirrors (1986), and two new recordings: a cover version of "Everlasting Love" and "Stop for a Minute". Despite the title, the album includes the non-single track "Don't Cry (The Breakup of the World)" from Mirrors. The album was produced by Michael Cretu and Armand Volker. The album's booklet included short reminiscences for every track. A video version of the album was released on VHS, including nine music videos and behind-the-scenes material.

"Everlasting Love" was released as the lead single from the album and became one of Sandra's most successful singles, reaching the top five in Germany, Greece and Switzerland. "Stop for a Minute" followed as the second and final single in early 1988, and reached the top 10 in Germany, as well as the top 20 in Switzerland and Denmark. The album itself reached the top 20 in Germany and Switzerland.

== Track listing ==
Side one
No.	Title	Lyrics	Music	Length
1.	"Everlasting Love"	Mac Gayden	James Cason	3:51
2.	"Hi! Hi! Hi!"	Michael Cretu; Klaus Hirschburger	Cretu; Hubert Kemmler	4:08
3.	"Stop for a Minute"	Hirschburger	Cretu	4:05
4.	"Innocent Love"	Susanne Müller; Hirschburger	Kemmler; Ulrich Herter	5:23
5.	"Little Girl"	Hirschburger	Kemmler; Marcus Löhr; Cretu	3:11

Side two
No.	Title	Lyrics	Music	Length
6.	"Maria Magdalena" (Single version)	Richard Palmer-James	Kemmler; Löhr; Cretu	3:58
7.	"In the Heat of the Night"	Löhr; Hirschburger	Cretu; Kemmler	5:20
8.	"Midnight Man"	Kemmler; Hirschburger	Kemmler; Cretu	3:03
9.	"Don't Cry (The Breakup of the World)"	Kemmler; Hirschburger	Kemmler; Cretu	4:51
10.	"Loreen"	Frank Peter; Hirschburger	Peter; Cretu	4:17
Total length:				42:07

== Personnel ==
Credits adapted from the liner notes of Ten on One (The Singles).

- Sandra – lead vocals
- Michael Cretu – production, keyboards, programming, backing vocals
- Armand Volker – production (tracks 2, 4, 8, 9)
- Marcus Löhr – electric guitars, acoustic guitars
- Hubert Kemmler – backing vocals
- Peter Ries – backing vocals
- Tissy Thiers – backing vocals
- Curt Cress – electronic percussion (track 1)
- Mats Björklund – additional guitars
- Peter Cornelius – additional guitars
- Mike Schmidt – cover
- Dieter Eikelpoth – photography

== Charts ==
Chart performance for Ten on One (The Singles)
Chart (1987–1988)	Peak position
Austrian Albums (Ö3 Austria)	28
European Albums (Music & Media)	29
German Albums (Offizielle Top 100)	19
Swiss Albums (Schweizer Hitparade)	14

== Certifications ==
Certifications for Ten on One (The Singles)
Region	Certification	Certified units/sales
Austria (IFPI Austria)	Gold	25,000^{*}
France (SNEP)	Gold	100,000^{*}
Germany (BVMI)	Gold	250,000^{^}
Sweden (GLF)	Platinum	100,000^{^}
Switzerland (IFPI Switzerland)	Platinum	50,000^{^}
^{*} Sales figures based on certification alone.^{^} Shipments figures based on certification alone.
