= Hold Me, Thrill Me, Kiss Me (Gloria Estefan album) =

Studio album by Gloria Estefan
- Released: October 18, 1994
- Recorded: 1993–1994
- Studios: Crescent Moon Studios and Criteria Studios (Miami, Florida); Edison Studios (New York City, New York)
- Genres: Dance; pop
- Length: 46:08 (first US, Canadian and Argentinean version); 56:07 (worldwide version)
- Label: Epic
- Producers: Emilio Estefan Jr.; Clay Ostwald; Jorge Casas; Lawrence Dermer

Gloria Estefan chronology
| Christmas Through Your Eyes (1993) | Hold Me, Thrill Me, Kiss Me (1994) | Abriendo Puertas (1995) |

Singles from Hold Me, Thrill Me, Kiss Me
- 1. "Turn the Beat Around" Released: September 27, 1994; 2. "Hold Me, Thrill Me, Kiss Me" Released: November 21, 1994 (UK, Europe and Australia); 3. "Everlasting Love" Released: January 3, 1995; 4. "It's Too Late" Released: May 9, 1995; 5. "Cherchez La Femme" Released: June 1995

Professional ratings
Review scores
| Source | Rating |
|---|---|
| AllMusic | 2.5/5 stars |
| Entertainment Weekly | B |
| Knoxville News Sentinel | 4/5 stars |
| Music Week | 4/5 stars |

Hold Me, Thrill Me, Kiss Me is the fifth studio solo album and first cover album by Cuban-American singer Gloria Estefan, released in October 1994. It is Estefan's 17th album overall. The album features cover versions of songs from artists such as Carole King, Elton John, Vicki Sue Robinson, Karen Chandler, and Robert Knight, among others. Hold Me, Thrill Me, Kiss Me peaked at number nine on the US Billboard 200 and has sold over 2 million copies in the United States.

The album includes the hit singles "Turn the Beat Around" and "Everlasting Love", both of which topped the Billboard Hot Dance Club Play chart.

== Critical reception ==
Upon the release, Billboard magazine wrote, "Her pick list is wide ranging and highly entertaining, meandering from the thrilling sounds of elegant title track, to disco nugget 'Turn the Beat Around', and on through the likes of 'Breaking Up Is Hard to Do', 'Love on a Two-Way Street', "It's Too Late', and lovelorn 'Goodnight, My Love'. Through it all, her voice is remarkable, her pleasure palpable. The enthusiasm is catching." Music & Media commented, "Caramba, coveritis has hit the Estefan estate. For every mood there's a song, but mainly for the late night wine-and-dine atmosphere. 'Don't Let the Sun Catch You Crying' feels like the kind of moonlit drama, the original singers Gerry & The Pacemakers intended it to be. The European bonus track 'Don't Let the Sun Go Down On Me' by you know who, only intensifies the romance which is in the air. Sometimes the tempo goes up like on the Blood, Sweat & Tears song 'You've Made Me So Very Happy'. For the single 'Turn the Beat Around'–an old '70s disco hit by Vicki Sue Robinson–she has even polished her Miami Sound Machine dancing shoes."

== Track listing ==
North American and Argentinean (first release) edition
| No. | Title | Writer(s) | Original artist | Length |
|---|---|---|---|---|
| 1. | "Hold Me, Thrill Me, Kiss Me" | Harry Noble Jr. | Karen Chandler | 3:21 |
| 2. | "How Can I Be Sure?" | Felix Cavaliere; Eddie Brigati | The Young Rascals | 3:15 |
| 3. | "Everlasting Love" | Buzz Cason; Mac Gayden | Robert Knight | 4:01 |
| 4. | "Traces" | Buddy Buie; J. R. Cobb; Emory Gordy Jr. | Classics IV | 3:22 |
| 5. | "Don't Let the Sun Catch You Crying (Note: Incorporates "Trois Gymnopédies", a variation on a theme by Erik Satie)" | Gerry Marsden; Freddie Marsden; Les Chadwick; Les Maguire | Gerry and the Pacemakers | 4:21 |
| 6. | "You've Made Me So Very Happy" | Berry Gordy Jr.; B. Holloway; Patrice Holloway; Frank Wilson | Brenda Holloway | 4:44 |
| 7. | "Turn the Beat Around" | Peter Jackson; Gerald Jackson | Vicki Sue Robinson | 3:52 |
| 8. | "Breaking Up Is Hard to Do" | Sedaka; Howard Greenfield | Neil Sedaka | 3:13 |
| 9. | "Love on a Two-Way Street" | Sylvia Robinson; Bert Keyes | The Moments | 4:12 |
| 10. | "Cherchez La Femme" | August Darnell; Stony Browder Jr. | Dr. Buzzard's Original Savannah Band | 4:58 |
| 11. | "It's Too Late" | King; Toni Stern | Carole King | 3:57 |
| 12. | "Goodnight, My Love" | George Motola; John Marascalco | Jesse Belvin | 2:52 |
| Total length: | | | | 46:25 |

International release bonus track
| No. | Title | Writer(s) | Original artist | Length |
|---|---|---|---|---|
| 13. | "Don't Let The Sun Go Down on Me" | John; Bernie Taupin | Elton John | 6:12 |
| Total length: | | | | 52:40 |

Australian release bonus track
| No. | Title | Writer(s) | Original artist | Length |
|---|---|---|---|---|
| 14. | "Everlasting Love" (Alternate Mix) | Cason; Gayden | Robert Knight | 3:47 |
| Total length: | | | | 56:27 |

== Personnel ==
Adapted from AllMusic.

Musicians

- Gloria Estefan – vocals
- Clay Ostwald – programming (1, 9, 13), acoustic piano (1, 11, 13), Hammond organ (6), Fender Rhodes (8, 11), keyboards (9)
- Jorge Casas – programming (1–3, 9, 13), bass (1, 3, 6, 8, 9, 11, 13), classical guitar (2, 5), 12-string guitar (2, 11), mandocello (2), fretless bass (2, 5, 12), guitars (9)
- Lawrence Dermer – programming (2–4, 7, 8, 10), acoustic piano (2, 6, 8, 12), tambourine (2), Fender Rhodes (3, 7)
- Emilio Estefan, Jr. – accordion (2)
- Nathaniel Seidman – programming (7, 10)
- Tim Mitchell – guitars (1, 6, 8, 9), classical guitar (5), acoustic guitar (11), electric guitar (11)
- Andy Goldman – guitars (3, 4, 7, 9, 10, 12)
- Juanito Márquez – classical guitar (4)
- Brian Monroney – guitars (13)
- Israel "Cachao" López – double bass (4)
- Frank Cornelius – bass (7)
- Steve Rucker – drums (2, 4, 6, 8, 11–12)
- Edwin Bonilla – percussion (3, 5–6, 11)
- Ed Calle – tenor saxophone (3, 6, 7, 10, 11), soprano saxophone (4), baritone saxophone (6, 11), flute (7)
- Whit Sidener – alto saxophone (3)
- Nestor Torres – alto flute (5)
- Cindy Sluka – English horn (5), oboe (5)
- Gary Lindsay – alto saxophone (6, 7, 10, 11)
- Paquito D'Rivera – clarinet (10)
- Teddy Mulet – trombone (2, 6, 7, 10), muted trumpet (6)
- Dana Teboe – trombone (3, 6, 7, 10, 11)
- Randy Barlow – trumpet (2, 3, 6, 7, 10, 11), programming (11)
- Jim Hacker – trumpet (6, 7, 10, 11)
- Lauren Hammock – French horn (2, 10)
- Andrew Lewinter – French horn (2, 10)
- Stephen Sigurdson – cello (5)

Orchestra (Tracks 1, 2, 4, 7–10 & 12)

- Hector Garrido – string orchestration and conductor (1, 4, 7, 12)
- Juanito Márquez – string orchestration and conductor (2, 8–10)
- David Nadien – orchestra contractor, concertmaster
- Atsushi Kosugi – orchestra coordinator
- Jesse Levy, Richard Locker, Charles McCracken, Mark Shuman and Fred Zlotkin – cello
- John Beal and Homer Mensch – double bass
- Lamar Alsop, Julien Barber, Olivia Koppell and Sue Pray – viola
- Abe Appleman, Elena Barare, Barry Finclair, Regis Iandiorio, Jean Ingraham, Harold Kohon, Charles Libove, Jan Mullen, David Nadien, Sandra Park, John Pintavalle, Matthew Raimondi, Laura Seaton, Richard Sortomme, Marti Sweet, Gerard Tarack and Donna Tecco – violin

Backing vocals

- Gloria Estefan
- Donna Allen – backing vocals (1, 3, 7)
- Lawrence Dermer – backing vocals (1, 3, 9, 10, 12)
- Joy Francis – backing vocals (1)
- LaGaylia Frazier – backing vocals (1, 10)
- Rick Krive – backing vocals (1)
- Rita Quintero – backing vocals (1, 13)
- Charles Christopher – backing vocals (3, 9, 12)
- Chelto Quiñones – backing vocals (10)
- Jon Secada – backing vocals (13)

=== Production ===
- Emilio Estefan, Jr. – executive producer, producer, management
- Jorge Casas – producer
- Clay Ostwald – producer
- Lawrence Dermer – producer
- Eric Schilling – engineer, mixing (1–4, 6–8, 10, 13)
- Mike Couzzi – mixing (5, 9, 11, 12)
- Patrice Levinsohn – additional engineer
- Scott Perry – additional engineer
- Ted Stein – additional engineer
- Ron Taylor – additional engineer
- Marcelo Añez – assistant engineer
- Scott Canto – assistant engineer
- Sean Chambers – assistant engineer
- Mark Gruber – assistant engineer
- Sebastián Krys – assistant engineer
- Steve Robillar – assistant engineer
- Yvonne Yedibalian – assistant engineer
- Bob Ludwig – mastering at Gateway Mastering (Portland, Maine)
- Nancy Donald – art direction
- Hooshik Sharon Bayliss – design
- Alberto Tolot – photography
- Serena Radaelli – hair
- Francesca Tolot – make-up
- Robertino Trovati – stylist

== Chart positions ==
=== Weekly charts ===
| Chart (1994–1995) | Peak position |
|---|---|
| Australian Albums (ARIA) | 11 |
| Canadian Albums (RPM) | 36 |
| Dutch Albums (Album Top 100) | 16 |
| European Albums (Music & Media) | 28 |
| German Albums (Offizielle Top 100) | 89 |
| New Zealand Albums (RMNZ) | 18 |
| Scottish Albums (Official Charts) | 14 |
| Spanish Albums (Promusicae) | 6 |
| Swiss Albums (Schweizer Hitparade) | 40 |
| UK Albums (Official Charts) | 5 |
| US Billboard 200 | 9 |

=== Year-end charts ===
| Chart (1995) | Peak position |
|---|---|
| US Billboard 200 | 61 |

== Certifications and sales ==
| Region | Certification | Certified units/sales |
|---|---|---|
| Argentina | — | 99,000 |
| Australia (ARIA) | Platinum | 70,000^{^} |
| Canada (Music Canada) | Platinum | 100,000^{^} |
| Japan (RIAJ) | Gold | 100,000^{^} |
| Spain (Promusicae) | 4× Platinum | 400,000^{^} |
| United Kingdom (BPI) | Platinum | 300,000^{^} |
| United States (RIAA) | 2× Platinum | 2,000,000^{^} |
^{^} Shipments figures based on certification alone.

== Accolades ==
| Year | Award Show | Award |
|---|---|---|
| 1995 | Billboard Music Award | Billboard Music Video of the Year for "Everlasting Love" |

== Release history ==
| Region | Date |
|---|---|
| Europe | October 17, 1994 |
| Canada | October 18, 1994 |
| United States | October 18, 1994 |
| Australia & New Zealand | November 1, 1994 |
| Austria | October 14, 1994 |
| Asia | November 1, 1994 |
| France | October 18, 1994 |
| Germany | October 14, 1994 |
| Latin America | November 1, 1994 |
| Poland | October 21, 1994 |
| Spain | October 19, 1994 |
| Switzerland | October 17, 1994 |
| Japan | November 3, 1994 |
