= Town Criers =

Australian pop band (1964–1972)

- Origin: Melbourne, Victoria, Australia
- Genres: Pop
- Years active: 1964–1972
- Labels: Trend; Astor; Festival; HMV
- Past members: Andy Agtoft; Mark Demajo; Sam Dunnin; Chris Easterby; George Kurtiss; John Taylor; Barry Smith; Norman Roth

The Town Criers were an Australian pop band formed in 1964. By 1967 their line-up was Andy Agtoft on lead vocals, Mark Demajo on bass guitar (ex-Gemini 5), Sam Dunnin on lead guitar (ex-Gemini 5), Chris Easterby on drums, and George Kurtiss on keyboards. Their first single was a cover version of the Kinks' album track, "The World Keeps Going Round", which was issued in 1965 but did not chart.

They released a cover version of American singer, Robert Knight's "Everlasting Love", as a single in February 1968, which reached No. 17 on the Go-Set National Top 40 alongside United Kingdom's Love Affair's rendition which peaked at No. 23 on the same chart at the same time. Kurtiss left the group in May 1968 and was replaced on keyboards by John Taylor (ex-Strings Unlimited). Their next single, "Unexpectedly", did not reach the top 40.

Agtoft was replaced early in 1969 by Barry Smith from Adelaide and Taylor left without being replaced. Town Criers released further singles, "Any Old Time (You're Lonely and Sad)" (March 1969), "Love Me Again" (October 1969) and "Living in a World of Love" (May 1970), before disbanding in 1972. Australian musicologist, Ian McFarlane, opined, "[they] made a name for themselves with a melodious, commercial pop sound and squeaky-clean teen idol image... By the end of 1971, [their] sound had become outmoded, and the members went their separate ways."

== Discography ==
=== Compilation albums ===
List of compilation albums, with selected details
| Title | Details |
|---|---|
| Complete Recordings | Released: 2000; Label: The Town Criers; Format: CD |

=== Extended plays ===
List of extended plays, with selected details
| Title | Details |
|---|---|
| Everlasting Love | Released: 1968; Label: Astor (AEP-4057); Format: LP |
| Love Me Again | Released: 1969; Label: Astor (FX-11655); Format: LP |

=== Singles ===
List of singles, with selected chart positions
| Title | Year | Peak chart positions |
| Title | Year | AUS |
|---|---|---|
| "The World Keeps Going Round" | 1965 | — |
| "Everlasting Love" | 1968 | 17 |
| "Unexpectedly" | 1968 | — |
| "Any Old Time (Your Lonely and Sad)" | 1969 | 53 |
| "Love Me Again" | 1969 | 35 |
| "Living in a World of Love" | 1970 | 42 |
| "Laughing Man" | 1971 | — |
| "Love, Love, Love" | 1971 | — |
