= My Rainbow Valley =

1967 song by Robert Knight

"Rainbow Valley"

Single by the Love Affair

from the album The Everlasting Love Affair
- B-side: "Someone Like Me"
- Released: 5 April 1968
- Recorded: 1968
- Genre: Pop
- Length: 3:48
- Label: CBS
- Songwriters: Buzz Cason; Mac Gayden
- Producer: Mike Smith

The Love Affair singles chronology
"Everlasting Love" (1967)	"Rainbow Valley" (1968)	"A Day Without Love" (1968)

"My Rainbow Valley" is a song first recorded and released by American singer Robert Knight on his 1967 album Everlasting Love. It was later released as a single in May 1968. However, the song is better known for being covered by British band the Love Affair, whose version was released as "Rainbow Valley", and which became a top-ten hit in several countries.

== The Love Affair version ==
"Rainbow Valley" was written by Buzz Cason and Mac Gayden, who had written the band's previous number-one single "Everlasting Love", which had also been first released by Robert Knight. After finding out about the Love Affair's version of "Rainbow Valley", Knight said "They sure follow me around, don't they?... I suppose I should be flattered that they like my voice and style enough to copy my songs".

After the release of "Everlasting Love", it was revealed that the band had controversially not played on the song. When promoting "Rainbow Valley", they insisted they had played on the song. However, according to the band's official website, "Rainbow Valley" consisted of session musicians Big Jim Sullivan on guitar, Russ Stableford on bass, and Clem Cattini on drums. It also features Sue Glover and Sunny Leslie on backing vocals along with an accompaniment by the Keith Mansfield Orchestra. Despite being released at the beginning of April 1968, "Rainbow Valley" did not initially chart very highly. Guitarist Rex Brayley put it down to " the lack of radio and TV plugs", with keyboardist Morgan Fisher adding that "I think there was an anti feeling in the business. Our record came out at the same time as new ones by The Small Faces ["Lazy Sunday"] and The Herd ["I Don't Want Our Loving to Die"], and they've been on TV five or six times while we've only done one".

=== Reception ===
Reviewing for New Musical Express, Derek Johnson described "Rainbow Valley" as "a predictable follow-up from Love Affair — the song is similar in concept to "Everlasting Love" and the arrangement almost identical. There's the same cantering rhythm and explosive orchestral accompaniment. Steve Ellis' earthy voice handles the lyric — and, due to one or two intricacies and tempo breaks — he's given more chance to display his dexterity and flexibility than on the group's No.1 hit". Peter Jones for Record Mirror described the song as "Good, obviously, following on a number one – and the young Mr. Ellis sings even better on this slightly confused beater. Not directly so commercial, but it proves a few points about the boys' ability". For Disc and Music Echo, Penny Valentine wrote "of course there's a lot of their first hit's influence – especially during the opening with the bongos. But from then on its all very, very good pop music".

=== Charts ===
Chart (1968)	Peak position
Germany (GfK)	37
Ireland (IRMA)	6
Netherlands (Dutch Top 40)	32
New Zealand (Listener)	7
UK Melody Maker Pop 30	6
UK New Musical Express Top 30	6
UK Record Retailer Top 50	5
