= Paintings in Yellow =

1990 studio album by Sandra

Studio album by Sandra
- Released: 26 March 1990
- Recorded: 1989–1990
- Studios: A.R.T. (Ibiza, Spain)
- Genres: Pop; new-age
- Length: 48:59
- Label: Virgin
- Producer: Michael Cretu

Sandra chronology
Everlasting Love (1988)	Paintings in Yellow (1990)	Close to Seven (1992)

Singles from Paintings in Yellow
- 1. "Hiroshima" Released: 29 January 1990; 2. "(Life May Be) A Big Insanity" Released: May 1990; 3. "One More Night" Released: September 1990

Paintings in Yellow is the fourth studio album by German singer Sandra, released on 26 March 1990 by Virgin Records. It was commercially successful and spawned the single "Hiroshima".

== Background and release ==
The album was recorded at A.R.T. Studios, Sandra and Michael Cretu's home studio in Ibiza, Spain. The material showcased more mature sound, departing from Sandra's previous, up-tempo dance songs in favour of a more reflective and sophisticated style. Much of the material, especially the five-part track "The Journey", foreshadowed the sound of Enigma, a new-age music project that Michael and Sandra were working on during the making of the album. Frank Peterson, who was the co-producer on the Enigma project, took up the role of co-writing some of the tracks on Paintings in Yellow.

The cover of Wishful Thinking's "Hiroshima" was released as the lead single in February 1990, becoming a top-five chart success in Germany and Switzerland. It was followed by two further singles in 1990, "(Life May Be) A Big Insanity" and the ballad "One More Night", which were moderately successful on the charts. A new version of the album track "Johnny Wanna Live" was included on her 1992 compilation album 18 Greatest Hits and released as a single on October 5, 1992 to promote the collection.

Paintings in Yellow became Sandra's highest-charting album in Germany at number four, in addition to a top-10 peak in Switzerland. The record has been certified gold in Germany and France, and platinum in Switzerland.

== Critical reception ==
Music & Media described the album as "[w]ell balanced and seamlessly commercial" and commented that "Sandra's sensual voice is wrapped in a sea of breathy instrumentation", but concluded that "despite the undeniable commerciality of it all this is rather predictable."

== Track listing ==
No.	Title	Lyrics	Music	Length
1.	"Hiroshima"	David Morgan	Morgan	6:50
2.	"(Life May Be) A Big Insanity"	Michael Cretu; Klaus Hirschburger	Cretu	4:29
3.	"Johnny Wanna Live"	Cretu; Hirschburger	Cretu; Frank Peterson	4:26
4.	"Lovelight in Your Eyes"	Cretu; Hirschburger	Cretu	5:27
5.	"One More Night"	Cretu; Hirschburger	Cretu; Peterson	4:06
6.	"The Skin I'm In"	Peterson; Hirschburger	Cretu; Peterson	3:40
7.	"Paintings in Yellow"	Cretu; Hirschburger	Cretu	5:50
8.	"The Journey" a. "Cold Out Here" b. "I'm Alive" c. "Paintings" d. "Come Alive" e. "The End"	Cretu; Hirschburger	Cretu; Peterson	7:27
9.	"Hiroshima" (extended club mix)	Morgan	Morgan	6:44
Total length:				48:59

== Personnel ==
Credits adapted from the liner notes of Paintings in Yellow.

- Sandra – vocals
- Michael Cretu – production, arrangements, performance, engineering
- Frank Peterson – arrangements, performance, engineering
- Tom Leonardt – all acoustic and electric guitars
- Mike Schmidt – art direction
- Stefan Langner – photography

== Charts ==
=== Weekly charts ===
Weekly chart performance for Paintings in Yellow
Chart (1990)	Peak position
Austrian Albums (Ö3 Austria)	14
European Albums (Music & Media)	12
Finnish Albums (Suomen virallinen lista)	28
French Albums (IFOP)	13
German Albums (Offizielle Top 100)	4
Swedish Albums (Sverigetopplistan)	30
Swiss Albums (Schweizer Hitparade)	8

=== Year-end charts ===
Year-end chart performance for Paintings in Yellow
Chart (1990)	Position
European Albums (Music & Media)	59
German Albums (Offizielle Top 100)	50

== Certifications ==
Certifications for Paintings in Yellow
Region	Certification	Certified units/sales
France (SNEP)	Gold	100,000^{*}
Germany (BVMI)	Gold	250,000^{^}
Switzerland (IFPI Switzerland)	Platinum	50,000^{^}
^{*} Sales figures based on certification alone.^{^} Shipments figures based on certification alone.
