= The Everlasting Love Affair =

Studio album by Love Affair
- Released: December 1968
- Recorded: November 1968, CBS Recording Studios
- Genre: Psychedelic pop; Blue-eyed soul; Psychedelic rock
- Label: CBS
- Producer: John Goodison, Mike Smith

Love Affair chronology
The Everlasting Love Affair (1968)	New Day (1971)

The Everlasting Love Affair is the debut studio album by the English pop band Love Affair. Released in December 1968, it includes the group's first three hit singles, among them "Everlasting Love", which had reached number one on the UK Singles Chart in February that year. The band had become one of the most popular groups in the United Kingdom, second in sales only to The Beatles. The album did not reflect their singles success as it failed to impact the UK Albums Chart.

== Background ==
The Love Affair achieved critical acclaim in the United Kingdom when their single "Everlasting Love" was released in December 1967. The single reached number one in the UK Singles Chart on February 3, 1968, after securing extensive radio play, and advertising. Suddenly, the band was receiving more notable gig offers, television appearances, and interviews. During an appearance on Jonathan King's show Good Evening, King said to the band, "You didn't play on the record", to which the band replied "No we didn't". Steve Ellis still contributed lead vocals to the single, but session musicians contributed the instrumental backing. This practice was common in studio recording and was continued on the band's later hits, but the statement caused ridicule, particularly from music critics. Still, the issue did not seem to affect the band's popularity as their next two singles reached the UK top ten.

The band recorded the album in November 1968 at the CBS Recording Studios. The band's keyboardist Morgan Fisher, who had taken a break from the band to complete his final year at Hendon County Grammar School, returned in time for involvement in the recording of the album. The album's recording process was brief. Due to their commitments, the band had one day to complete the album. The band was involved in the orchestral arrangements but session musicians were again incorporated as it was deemed the most effective way to utilise their limited time. The band lacked the confidence to compose their own songs so all of the tracks were either cover versions or written by Phillip Goodhand-Tait. Goodhand-Tait first contributed the B-side for "Everlasting Love", and when the tapes were complete, more compositions followed for the album. Many of the songs followed the pop formula that brought the band to success, a cause of frustration for the group. The album was released in December 1968 to the UK, but it failed to chart nationally. In 2006, the album was reissued by Repertoire Records with eight bonus-tracks and a 16-page booklet containing an illustrated history of the band.

== Track listing ==
1. "Everlasting Love" – 3:02
2. "Hush" – 3:45
3. "60 Minutes (Of Your Time)" – 3:39
4. "Could I Be Dreaming" – 3:19
5. "The First Cut Is the Deepest" – 3:24
6. "So Sorry" – 3:11
7. "Once Upon a Season" – 4:01
8. "Rainbow Valley" – 3:50
9. "A Day Without Love" - 3:14
10. "Tobacco Road – 3:55
11. "The Tree" – 2:48
12. "Handbags & Gladrags" – 3:52
13. "Build on Love" – 2:31
14. "Please Stay" – 4:17
15. "Tale of Two Bitters" – 2:36

== Personnel ==
- Steve Ellis – vocals
- Maurice Bacon – drums
- Rex Brayley – guitar
- Auguste Eadon – flute, backing vocals
- Morgan Fisher – keyboards
- Lynton Guest – keyboards
- Mick Jackson – bass
