= Johnny Wanna Live =

Single by Sandra

from the album 18 Greatest Hits
- B-side: "Mirrored in Your Eyes"
- Released: October 1992
- Recorded: 1990
- Genre: Pop
- Length: 3:52 (1992 version); 4:29 (1990 version)
- Label: Virgin
- Songwriters: Michael Cretu, Klaus Hirschburger, Frank Peterson
- Producer: Michael Cretu

Sandra singles chronology
"I Need Love" (1992)	"Johnny Wanna Live" (1992)	"Maria Magdalena" (1993)

Licensed audio
- "Johnny Wanna Live" on YouTube

Licensed audio
- "Johnny Wanna Live" on YouTube

"Johnny Wanna Live" is a pop song by German singer Sandra, written by Michael Cretu, Klaus Hirschburger and Frank Peterson, and produced by Cretu. The song was originally released on Sandra's fourth studio album Paintings in Yellow in 1990 and was subsequently remixed for her 1992 compilation 18 Greatest Hits. The new version was released as a single to promote the album, backed with "Mirrored in Your Eyes" from Sandra's most recent album at that time, Close to Seven, and only met with minor chart success.

"Johnny Wanna Live" is a protest song against cruelty to animals and the name Johnny collectively represents every animal. The song resulted from Sandra's disapproval of people wearing fur coats.

== Critical reception ==
Music & Media commented, "Taken from this year's album Close to Seven, this is the best advertisement for the new CD compilation 18 Greatest Hits, a perfect perspective on her career. On this song her husband/producer uses the same beats as on his Enigma project, where Sandra took part of the vocals."

== Music video ==
The music video was directed by British director Howard Greenhalgh and pictured various scenes of cruelty to animals, such as hunting and animal testing, as well as a model wearing a fur coat. The clip was released on Sandra's VHS video compilation 18 Greatest Hits in 1992, and the 2003 DVD The Complete History.

== Formats and track listings ==
- CD maxi single
1. "Johnny Wanna Live" – 3:52
2. "Johnny Wanna Live" (Extended Version) – 5:18
3. "Mirrored in Your Eyes" – 3:26
- 7" single

A. "Johnny Wanna Live" – 3:50
B. "Mirrored in Your Eyes" – 3:26

- 12" single

A. "Johnny Wanna Live" (Extended Version) – 5:18
B1. "Johnny Wanna Live" – 3:50
B2. "Mirrored in Your Eyes" – 3:26

== Charts ==
Chart (1992–1993)	Peak position
Germany (Official German Charts)	37
Netherlands (Single Top 100)	67

== Cover versions ==
- The song was covered by Sarah Brightman, in fact a then-girlfriend of the co-writer of the song, Frank Peterson, on her 1993 album Dive.
