= Wishful Thinking (British band) =

British rock band

- Origin: England
- Genres: Progressive rock; folk rock
- Years active: 1965–present
- Labels: Decca; Ampex; Ariola; Atlantic; B&C; Deram; Global
- Members: Tony Collier; John Franklin
- Past members: Kevin Finn; Brian Allen; Roy Daniels; Terry New; Alan Elkins; Richard Taylor; Roger Charles; John Redpath; Pete Ridley
- Website: wishfulthinkinggroup.co.uk

Wishful Thinking are a British rock band, originally formed in the 1960s.

The band's biggest success was the song Hiroshima, in 1978, achieving a top ten position in the German charts. They had previously had a small success in 1966 with the song "Step by Step", which listed in the "Big L Fab 40", a hit parade at the pirate radio station Wonderful Radio London.

== History ==
In 1963, Roy Daniels (vocals), Richard Taylor (lead guitar), Alan Elkins (2nd lead guitar), Roger Charles (bass) and Brian Allen (drums) formed the group "Emeralds" which was renamed to "Wishful Thinking" from 1965 onward. In 1964, Alan Elkins left the formation.

The band's first single in 1963, and two more in 1965 were released under the initial band name "Emeralds". It was common practice in the 1960s to use experienced session musicians in the studio due to the cost of studio time. Their second single "Don't Listen to Your Friends" (1965) featured session guitarist Big Jim Sullivan from the Tom Jones band. Their third single "King Lonely The Blue" (1965) featured session guitarist Jimmy Page who later became famous with Led Zeppelin. A subsequent single "Count To Ten" (1967) featured some session drumming from Mitch Mitchell from The Jimi Hendrix Experience.

In 1965, Richard Taylor was replaced by Terry New. In 1966 the song "Step by Step" was listed in the "Big L Fab 40", a hit parade at the pirate radio station Wonderful Radio London.

Singer Roy Daniels left the band in 1967. He was replaced by Kevin Scott (born Kevin Finn), who also used the name Danny Finn and was later singer with the New Seekers from 1976 to 1978. In 1967, Terry New was replaced by John Franklin (guitar) and Roger Charles was replaced by Tony Collier (bass). Tony Collier also performed the lead vocals on several songs. In the early 1970s, Brian Allen was replaced by Pete Ridley, and then John Redpath (drums) - who remained with the band until 1979.

Wishful Thinking recorded the album titled "Hiroshima" at Chappel Recording Studios, Wimbledon, London. The first release in Germany in 1971 was simply titled "Wishful Thinking". John "Speedy Fingers" Timperley was the audio engineer. Ruan O'Lochlainn who also worked with Jethro Tull, Rick Wakeman and Ringo Starr, did cover artwork and photography. Lou Reizner was producer of the single and album.

In 1973, Wishful Thinking was involved in the soundtrack for the British music film That'll Be the Day (with David Essex and Ringo Starr). They contributed the song "It'll be Me" and they can be seen next to Billy Fury at a dance contest.

In 1980, the group became inactive. On April 16, 2005, the band members Kevin Finn, Brian Allen, Roger Charles and John Franklin reunited to perform on television for RTL (German TV channel).

In May 2012, drummer Brian Allen (1941 - 2012) died. In February 2016, Kevin Finn ("Kevin Scott", "Danny Finn") (1950 - 2016) died after a brief illness.

== "Hiroshima" ==
Professional ratings
Review scores
| Source | Rating |
|---|---|
| AllMusic | 2.5/5 stars |

Written in 1969 by English songwriter Dave Morgan, "Hiroshima" served as the title track for their 1971 album, but it was not until its re-release as a single in May 1978 that it gained recognition. Lou Reizner was producer of the single and album, and also provided the spoken text on the song. At various points in time, it was released in the UK, Germany, the Netherlands, Belgium, Denmark and Spain. It proved popular in continental Europe, staying 44 weeks in the German Top 40 charts, and reached its highest position at number 8 on 22 May 1978.

The album of the same name was released in 1971 in the UK, Germany, Canada and the US. As of 2019, Sony Music in Germany have the distribution rights for the Global Records and Tapes and Ariola catalog.

In 1982, a German language cover version of "Hiroshima" was released by the East German rock band Puhdys.

In 1990, German singer Sandra released her version of the song, which charted at number four in Germany, Switzerland and Israel and at number sixteen in France.

== Band members ==
=== Current ===
- Tony Collier - bass, vocals
- John Franklin - guitar

=== Former ===
- Kevin Finn - vocals
- Brian Allen - drums
- Roy Daniels - vocals
- Terry New - guitar
- Alan Elkins - guitar
- Richard Taylor - guitar
- Roger Charles - bass
- John Redpath - drums
- Pete Ridley - drums

== Discography ==
=== Albums ===
- 1967: Live Vol: 1 (LP), (DECCA SKL4900, UK, B), (DECCA SLK 16545-P, D)
- 1971: Wishful Thinking (LP) (Global Records 6306 903, D)
- 1971: Hiroshima (LP), (B&C CAS1038, UK)
- 1971: Hiroshima (LP), (AMPEX RECORDS A 10123, US, CAN), (Bandname: Wishfull Thinking)
- 1976: Hiroshima (LP), (MIDI MID 20105, D)
- 1976: Hiroshima (LP), (ATLANTIC ATL 50 271 (20 105), D)
- 1979: Hiroshima (LP), (Global Records and Tapes 0063.202, D)
- 1979: Hiroshima (LP), (Global Records and Tapes 206731-270, NL, B)
- 1988: Wishful Thinking (CD), (Global Records and Tapes 259311-217, D)
- 1988: Wishful Thinking (CD), (Ariola 259311 / EAN 4007192593118, NL, B)
- 1996: Live Vol: 1 (CD), (DERAM PHCR-4237, Japan)
- 2002: Live Vol. 2 (CD,) (Live: Vorup Ungdomsskole, Randers, Denmark 1968) (© Leif Vest, DK)
- 2007: Step By Step and other singles 1963-1968 plus unreleased tracks (CD) (FrostRecords.dk, DK)
- 2009: Believing in Dreams (CD), (© Wishful Thinking, UK)
- 2012: Wishful Thinking (CD), (Prog Temple PTCD 8003, Nov.2012)(Re-release of "Hiroshima")

=== Singles ===
- 1963: "The Kerry Dancers" / "Little White Lies" (as band name Emeralds) (His Masters Voice)
- 1965: "Don't Listen to Your Friends" / "Say Your Mine" (as Emeralds) (Decca) (with guitarist Big Jim Sullivan from the Tom Jones band)
- 1965: "King Lonely the Blue" / "Someone Else's Fool" (as Emeralds) (Decca) (with guitarist Jimmy Page)
- 1966: "Step by Step" (Decca)
- 1966: "Turning Round" / "V.I.P" (Decca)
- 1967: "Count to Ten" / "Hang Around Girl" (Decca) (with drummer Mitch Mitchell from the Jimi Hendrix Experience)
- 1967: "Cherry Cherry" / "Peanuts" (Decca / London Top Records)
- 1967: Peanuts / Cherry, Cherry / Step by Step / Looking Around (EP) (London)
- 1967: "Meet the Sun" / "Easier Said Than Loving You" (Abacus Music / Decca)
- 1968: "It's So Easy" (Decca)
- 1968: "Alone" (Decca)
- 1970: "Without a Place to Go / Waterfall" (Metronome)
- 1971: "Hiroshima" (Global Records/Phonogram)
- 1971: "United States of Europe '79" (Ampex Records)
- 1972: "Lu La Le Lu" (B&C Records) (with Klaus Voormann)
- 1972: "Clear White Light" / "Horizons" (B&C Records)
- 1975: "Hiroshima" / "She Belongs to the Night" (Atlantic)
- 1977: "Clear White Light" / "Horizons" (Atlantic)
- 1978: "Hiroshima" / "Hiroshima" (Atlantic)
- 1978: "Hiroshima (Special Mix New Long Version)"
- 1978: "America" / "You Lay Me Down" (Atlantic)
- 1979: "Hiroshima" (Global Records and Tapes)
- 1979: "State Fair Majorette" / "Crash at Honolulu" (Global Records and Tapes)
- 1980: "Tightrope Man" (Global Records and Tapes)
- 1982: Hiroshima / America (EP) (Global Records and Tapes)
- 1985: "Hiroshima" / "America" (Global Records and Tapes)
- 1989: "Hiroshima" / "America" / "State Fair Majorette" (Global Records and Tapes)
- 1990: "Hiroshima" (original version + Dave Morgan 90er-Mix) (Global Records and Tapes)
