= Everlasting Love =

1967 single by Robert Knight

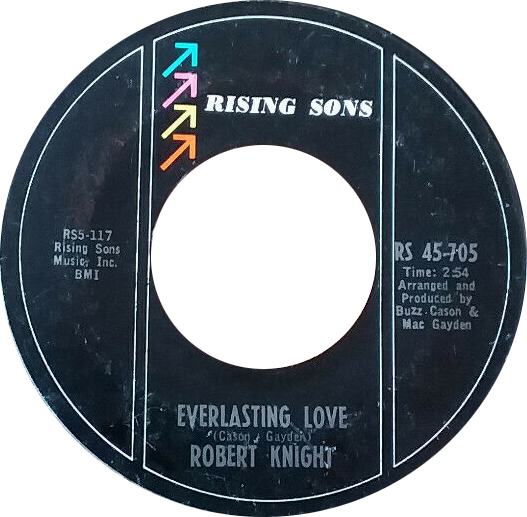
- One of side-A labels of the US single

Single by Robert Knight

from the album Everlasting Love
- B-side: "Somebody's Baby"
- Released: July 1967
- Recorded: 1967
- Studio: Fred Foster Sound Studio (Nashville, Tennessee)
- Genre: Soul; pop
- Length: 2:54
- Label: Rising Sons (RS45-705); Monument (MON 1008)
- Songwriters: Buzz Cason; Mac Gayden
- Producers: Buzz Cason; Mac Gayden

Robert Knight singles chronology
"Everlasting Love" (1967)	"Blessed Are the Lonely" (1968)

Official audio
- "Everlasting Love" on YouTube

"Everlasting Love" is a song written by Buzz Cason and Mac Gayden, originally a 1967 hit for Robert Knight and since covered numerous times. The most successful version in the UK was performed by Love Affair and the highest-charting version in the US was performed by Carl Carlton. Other cover versions were performed by Town Criers, Rex Smith & Rachel Sweet, Sandra Cretu, Worlds Apart, U2 and Gloria Estefan.

The original version of "Everlasting Love" was recorded by Knight in Nashville, with Cason and Gayden aiming to produce it in a Motown style reminiscent of the Four Tops and the Temptations. When released as a single in the US, the song reached No. 13 on the Billboard Hot 100 in 1967. Subsequently, the song has reached the US top 40 three times, most successfully as performed by Carl Carlton, peaking at No. 6 in 1974, with more moderate success by the duo Rex Smith and Rachel Sweet (No. 32 in 1981) and Gloria Estefan (No. 27 in 1995). Robert Knight's and Carl Carlton's versions both peaked during the last two weeks of November, 1967 for Knight, 1974 for Carlton.

In the UK, "Everlasting Love" was covered by the Love Affair: it achieved No. 1 status in January 1968, eclipsing the Robert Knight original. Also in 1968, a cover by the Australian group Town Criers reached No. 2 in the Australian charts. In the 1990s "Everlasting Love" reached the UK top 20 three times via remakes by Worlds Apart (No. 20 in 1993), Gloria Estefan (No. 19 in 1995) and, most successfully, a charity single by the cast from Casualty that reached No. 5 in 1998. In 2004, Jamie Cullum's version peaked at No. 20. Thus, "Everlasting Love" is one of two songs to become a Billboard Hot 100 top 40 hit in the 1960s, 1970s, 1980s, and 1990s (the other being "The Way You Do the Things You Do") and the only song to become a UK top 40 hit in the 1960s, 1970s, 1980s, 1990s, and 2000s.

== Robert Knight version ==
The original version of "Everlasting Love" was recorded at the Fred Foster Sound Studio in Nashville. According to Cason, the track "had some different sounds on it that, for the time period, were kind of innovative. The string sound is actually a Farfisa organ that Mac came up with, and we used a lot of echo." Robert Knight recalls: "Buzz was into country [music] but Mac was R&B... so we made it more of an R&B song like the rhythm and melody Mac had. I practiced and practiced on with Mac, as he had written the song for my voice and made it mine. Mac used his bandmates: [drummer] Kenny Buttrey, [bassist] Norbert Putnam, Charlie McCoy and himself on guitar." The background vocals on the song were performed by Buzz Cason and Carol Montgomery. Robert Knight recalls that he heard "Everlasting Love" for the first time at the actual recording session: "I didn't sing it the [as] written[:] I made some changes to fit my voice, and I didn't do it note for note. They had the melody going too fast, and it was jamming, it wasn't doing right, it wasn't sounding right. So I started what you call a steady step. I start singing a beat and a half: 'hearts-go-a-stray' – like that. It wasn't like that in the beginning, and I think that's what got 'Everlasting Love' off the ground."

Debuting on the Billboard Hot 100 dated September 30, 1967, "Everlasting Love" had already reached No. 1 in Philadelphia and Detroit by the time of its top 40 debut on October 21, 1967. Cason admitted that the single "drove ... the promotion guys nuts since it hit in one market then several weeks later pop up somewhere else." The track spent its second week at its Hot 100 peak of No. 13 on the chart dated November 25, 1967 then dropped off the Hot 100 over the next three weeks. The R&B chart peak of "Everlasting Love" was No. 14. In its original release, Knight's "Everlasting Love" lost out in the UK to a cover by Love Affair, although Knight's version did spend two weeks at No. 40 UK in January 1968. In the spring of 1974, Knight's "Everlasting Love" had a second UK release to follow up the Top Ten success of the reissue of Knight's "Love on a Mountain Top"; this time the first-named track reached No. 19.

An airplay staple on American oldies radio stations (though less so than the 1974 Carl Carlton version), Knight's "Everlasting Love" has become a "cult favorite" of the beach music scene. In a 2011 interview, Buzz Cason stated that the Robert Knight original of "Everlasting Love" remained Cason's favorite version of the song: "I just think Robert's was the one [version] that had the magic in it." Coinciding with Carl Carlton's version, Knight also re-recorded the song for single-only release in 1974, and this version is now as widely played as his original.

=== Charts ===
Chart (1967–68)	Peak position
Canada Top Singles (RPM)	26
Sweden (Tio i Topp)	6
UK Singles (OCC)	40
US Billboard Hot 100	13
US R&B (Billboard)	14

Chart (1974)	Peak position
UK Singles (OCC)	19

== Love Affair version ==
"Everlasting Love"
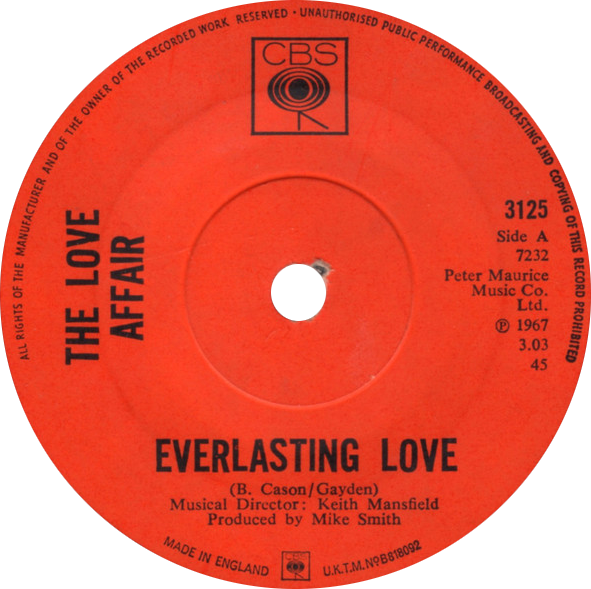
- Solid center variant of the UK single

Single by the Love Affair

from the album The Everlasting Love Affair
- B-side: "Gone Are the Songs of Yesterday"
- Released: December 1967
- Recorded: 1967
- Studio: Island, London
- Genre: Pop-soul
- Length: 3:03
- Label: CBS (3125)
- Songwriters: Buzz Cason; Mac Gayden
- Producers: Mike Smith; Keith Mansfield

The Love Affair singles chronology
"She Smiled Sweetly" (1967)	"Everlasting Love" (1967)	"Rainbow Valley" (1968)

Music video
- "Everlasting Love" on YouTube

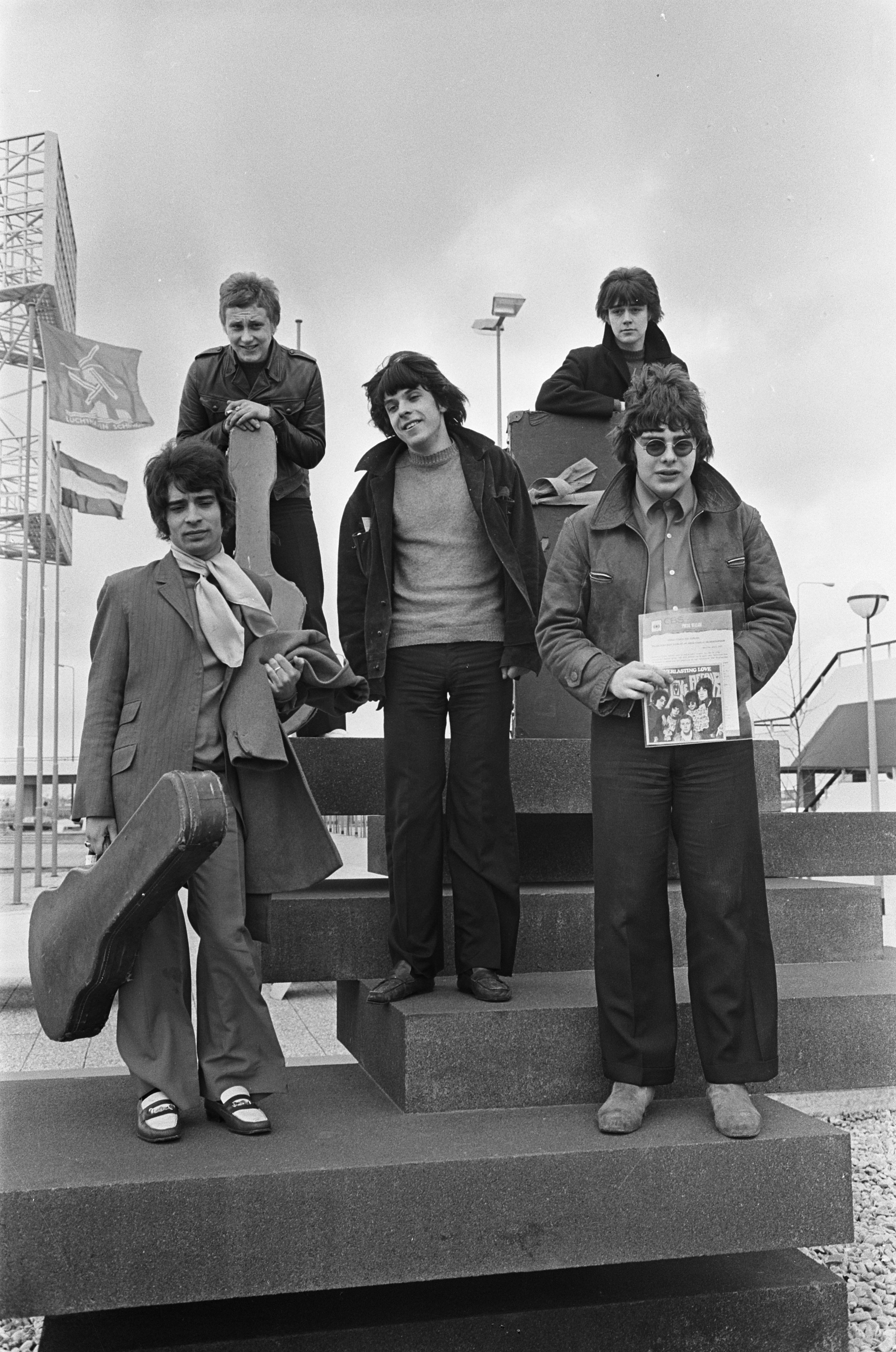
Love Affair, 1968

"Everlasting Love" was recorded by Love Affair in 1967. According to the band's lead vocalist Steve Ellis: "We had two managers, David Wedgebury and John Cokell, who both worked at Decca [and] had access to all the imports on the Monument label. We rehearsed in a factory in Walthamstow and one night they turned up with 'Everlasting Love' by Robert Knight. I loved it and so we set about putting it down on tape." Muff Winwood produced the original Love Affair version of "Everlasting Love" which was recorded at Island Studios and featured the group's actual members: Island Records passed on releasing the track but CBS in-house producer Mike Smith - after failing to interest his regular clients Marmalade in recording the song (which Marmalade deemed "too poppy") - cut a new Love Affair version of "Everlasting Love".

The second Love Affair recording of "Everlasting Love" in fact featured only one member of the group: lead vocalist Steve Ellis who fronted a session ensemble comprising arranger/conductor Keith Mansfield's 40-piece orchestra plus a rhythm section, the session musicians including Peter Ahern (triangle percussion), Clem Cattini (drums), Alan Parker (guitar), Russ Stableford (bass), and a chorale comprising Madeline Bell, Kiki Dee, Lesley Duncan, and Kay Garner: the track was recorded in two takes. Mike Smith would eventually attribute the non-utilization of the actual musicians in Love Affair to the need for expediency, arguing that "there just wasn't time for the group to learn the arrangement, so we used session musicians", a UK release for the Robert Knight original version being imminent.

Debuting on the UK Top 50 dated 3 January, 1968, "Everlasting Love" by the Love Affair rose to No. 1 in the UK Singles Chart for a two-week stay from 31 January. The track was also a Top 20 hit in a number of other European countries in 1968.

When the Love Affair appeared on the ITV programme Good Evening I'm Jonathan King host Jonathan King asked group bassist Mick Jackson if the band had actually played on their hit recording of "Everlasting Love" and Jackson admitted the track had featured Ellis backed by session musicians. Steve Ellis has stated that Jonathan King was aware of the background of the Love Affair hit and ambushed Mick Jackson to invoke controversy, although Jackson would state: "We announced it ourselves because there were rumours about it in the business and we heard a Sunday newspaper was going to blow the story". Jackson also stated: "At first we didn't worry that much when the story about us not playing came out... Then the thing escalated and people all over the place started slagging us. We got to regard it as a terrible nuisance, every time we opened a paper there was someone having a go at the Love Affair."

The adverse press had little if any negative impact on the band's popularity: their follow-up to "Everlasting Love", "Rainbow Valley" – another Cason/Gayden composition introduced by Robert Knight – reached number 5 in the UK and the additional success of "A Day Without Love" (number 6) made Love Affair the UK's top group in singles sales for 1968, apart from the Beatles. (The Love Affair singles continued to feature Ellis fronting a session ensemble with no other group members participating.)

All of these singles were released by CBS in the label's native United States on its Date Records subsidiary. However, despite their popularity in Europe, none of the Love Affair's singles charted in the US.

=== Charts ===
Chart (1968)	Peak position
Austria (Ö3 Austria Top 40)	12
Belgium (Ultratop Flanders)	15
Belgium (Ultratop Wallonia)	31
Canada Top Singles (RPM)	25
Netherlands (Dutch Top 40)	13
Netherlands (Single Top 100)	12
New Zealand (Listener)	4
Norway (VG-lista)	6
Switzerland (Swiss Hitparade)	6
UK Singles (OCC)	1
West Germany (Media Control)	12

=== Certifications ===
Region	Certification	Certified units/sales
United Kingdom (BPI)	Gold	400,000^{‡}
^{‡} Sales+streaming figures based on certification alone.

== Carl Carlton version ==
"Everlasting Love"
- One of pressings of the US single

Single by Carl Carlton

from the album Everlasting Love
- B-side: "I Wanna Be Your Main Squeeze"
- Released: July 1974
- Recorded: October 1973
- Studio: Creative Workshop, Berry Hill, Tennessee
- Genre: Disco
- Length: 2:20
- Label: Back Beat (BB 27001)
- Songwriters: Buzz Cason; Mac Gayden
- Producers: Papa Don Schroeder; Tommy Cogbill

Carl Carlton singles chronology
"You Can't Stop a Man in Love" (1973)	"Everlasting Love" (1974)	"Smokin' Room" (1974)

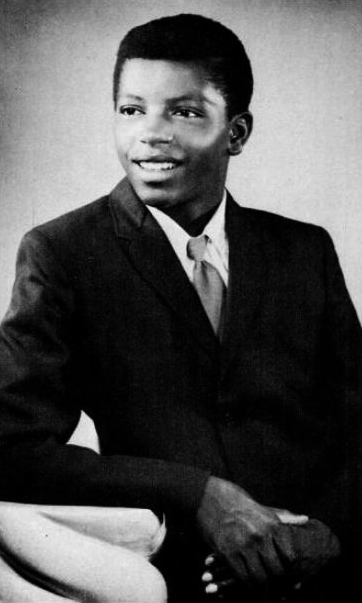
Carl Carlton, 1968

Carl Carlton recorded "Everlasting Love" in October 1973 at the Berry Hill (Tenn) studio Creative Workshop, which was owned by Buzz Cason; however, Cason was not involved in the recording of Carlton's version - the singer had himself chosen to record "Everlasting Love", which he knew via the version on David Ruffin's 1969 album My Whole World Ended. Produced by Papa Don Schroeder and Tommy Cogbill, Carlton's cover features Hayward Bishop on drums and percussion, Cogbill on bass, and Reggie Young on guitar. The recording was engineered by Travis Turk. The track features a distinctive countermelody running through most of the song consisting of background vocal harmonies. Brenda Russell is among the background vocalists.

Carlton's original recording of "Everlasting Love" was issued as the B-side of the 1973 single "I Wanna Be Your Main Squeeze"; the track (i.e. "Everlasting Love") was then issued in July 1974 as an A-side after having been given a disco style remix, and became a discothèque favorite before breaking on the Hot 100 in September 1974 to proceed to a No. 6 peak that November, almost reaching the R&B Top 10 at No. 11. It was Carlton's only top 10 hit on the Hot 100.

Carlton's version of "Everlasting Love" is the most successful US release of the song. It remains an airplay favorite on American oldies radio stations. According to Broadcast Music Incorporated (BMI), the 1974 Carl Carlton version has been played more than 4 million times. One of the earliest pop hits to crossover from disco airplay, Carlton's "Everlasting Love" is a staple of disco compilations, including the second installment of the Pure Disco CD compilation series.

=== Charts ===
==== Weekly charts ====
Chart (1974–75)	Peak position
Canada Top Singles (RPM)	19
Canada Adult Contemporary (RPM)	11
US Billboard Hot 100	6
US Easy Listening (Billboard)	15
US Hot Soul Singles (Billboard)	11

==== Year-end charts ====
Chart (1974)	Rank
Canada Top Singles (RPM)	93

== Rex Smith and Rachel Sweet version ==
"Everlasting Love"

Single by Rex Smith and Rachel Sweet

from the album: Everlasting Love (Rex Smith) and; ...And Then He Kissed Me (Rachel Sweet)
- B-side: "Still Thinking of You", "Billy and the Gun"
- Released: June 1981
- Recorded: 1981
- Studio: Record Plant (NYC)
- Genre: Pop
- Length: 3:44; 3:29 (single edit)
- Label: Columbia (18-02169)
- Songwriters: Mac Gayden; Buzz Cason
- Producer: Rick Chertoff

Rex Smith singles chronology
"Let's Make a Memory" (1979)	"Everlasting Love" (1981)	"Remember the Love Songs" (1981)

Rachel Sweet singles chronology
"Spellbound" (1980)	"Everlasting Love" (1981)	"Then He Kissed Me-Be My Baby" (1981)

Music video
- "Everlasting Love" on YouTube

"Everlasting Love" was recorded as a duet by Rex Smith and Rachel Sweet. This version features revised lyrics including an additional verse of uncredited authorship which was approved by the song's composers and which would be retained by Sandra for her 1987 remake. Recorded at the Record Plant (NYC) and featured on both Smith's Everlasting Love album and Sweet's ...And Then He Kissed Me, "Everlasting Love" as a single featured a two-track B-side featuring Smith's "Still Thinking of You" and Sweet's "Billy and the Gun", respectively taken from each singer's album cited above.

Both Rex Smith and Rachel Sweet were on the roster of Columbia Records with the album ...And Then He Kissed Me marking Sweet's label debut subsequent to two album releases on the new wave oriented Stiff label: according to Sweet, upon submitting the tracks intended to comprise her first album for Columbia – all original songs produced by Pete Solley – she'd been told: "we'd like you to cut some more songs. And we'd like it if they weren't yours." (Sweet would typify the "outside material" which would eventually appear on ...And Then He Kissed Me as "lighter and more overtly commercial than her own songs".) Smith meanwhile had recorded a solo remake of "Everlasting Love" intended for his album produced by Rick Chertoff – then best known for his work with Air Supply – and after Rachel Sweet's manager (and father) Dick Sweet learned of Smith's recording of the song, arrangements were made for "Everlasting Love" to be recorded as a duet: Chertoff remained as producer of this version which was the first "outside" track recorded for ...And Then He Kissed Me, and on the basis of his work on the Smith/Sweet version of "Everlasting Love", Chertoff was invited by Dick Sweet to record four additional tracks with Sweet which, with "Everlasting Love" and four of the tracks from the Peter Solley sessions, would eventually comprise the ...And Then He Kissed Me album.

The single was released in June 1981 in the US, July in the UK, and August in Australia. With neither Smith nor Sweet being a strong Top 40 force - Smith's solitary Billboard Hot 100 single had been "You Take My Breath Away" (No. 10 in 1979) while Sweet had yet to rank on the Hot 100 – their collaboration on "Everlasting Love" would only generate qualified chart impact: the single peaked at No. 32 on the Billboard Hot 100 in August 1981, affording Sweet her only Top 40 showing and Smith his second and last. It also appeared on Billboard's Hot Adult Contemporary chart peaking at No. 31. The single was also a mid-chart item in the UK at No. 35; in Australia it reached No. 41 mainly due to its being a local Top 10 hit in Adelaide at No. 9. In 1982, the Smith/Sweet version of "Everlasting Love" became a Top 10 hit in Switzerland and Denmark. The song received a positive review from the Austin American-Statesman which described it as "one of the best [recent hits]... superbly produced with a crystalline intensity [evoking] Phil Spector [classics]. A fine arrangement & the vocal [input] of the incomparable Rachel Sweet make [this] a pure delight."

A promotional video was shot for "Everlasting Love" with Smith and Sweet playing a couple getting married. The singers performed "Everlasting Love" live on the Solid Gold episode aired February 19, 1983: Smith was currently co-hosting the show on which Sweet guested to promote her current single "Voodoo".

=== Charts ===
Chart (1981–82)	Peak position
Australia (KMR)	41
Denmark (IFPI)	4
South Africa (Springbok Radio)	11
Switzerland (Swiss Hitparade)	9
UK Singles (OCC)	35
US Billboard Hot 100	32
US Adult Contemporary (Billboard)	31
US Cash Box Top 100	34

== Sandra version ==
"Everlasting Love"

Single by Sandra

from the album Ten on One (The Singles)
- B-side: "Change Your Mind", "Stop for a Minute"
- Released: September 1987
- Genre: Pop
- Length: 3:49; 7:16 (extended)
- Label: Virgin; Siren
- Songwriters: Mac Gayden; Buzz Cason
- Producers: Michael Cretu (1987 version); Pete Hammond (1988 version)

Sandra singles chronology
"Midnight Man" (1987)	"Everlasting Love" (1987)	"Stop for a Minute" (1988)

Music video
- "Everlasting Love" (Extended Version) on YouTube

German singer Sandra released a cover of "Everlasting Love" in bubblegum pop style with a driving drum line in 1987 as the lead single from her first greatest hits compilation Ten on One (The Singles). She was introduced to the song through the Love Affair version; she'd say of the song: "I have always loved it... Even as a little child I heard that song and I said that I would like to sing it sometime." However, for her remake of the song Sandra would use the lyrics of the 1981 Rex Smith/Rachel Sweet duet version. Sandra's version was produced by her partner, Michael Cretu.

The single was a hit in continental Europe in late 1987 and early 1988, reaching the Top 10 in her native Germany, as well as Switzerland, Austria, Greece, Denmark and South Africa. In West Germany and Austria, it was also a top 5 airplay hit, and a No. 13 airplay hit in Switzerland. In the pan-European rankings, it reached No. 6 on the sales chart and No. 34 on the airplay chart.

In the UK, the song originally only reached No. 88. The track was subsequently acquired by Pete Waterman, who had "Everlasting Love (the PWL mix)" – remixed by Pete Hammond – released in the UK in the summer of 1988 to barely improve on the original's UK chart performance with a No. 79 peak. However, "Everlasting Love (the PWL mix)" re-entered the UK chart in December 1988 to rise to No. 45 in January 1989, while in its Australian release, it reached the Adelaide hit parade at No. 21 and had a national chart showing of No. 72. In the US, "Everlasting Love (the PWL mix)" rose as high as No. 22 on the Billboard maxi single sales chart. The PWL mix of "Everlasting Love" was showcased on an Everlasting Love album, which was released in December 1988 only in the UK and the US. Besides "Everlasting Love (the PWL mix)", the album comprised the original versions of several of Sandra's European hits. The song remains one of Sandra's most successful singles and has reportedly sold around three million units.

The track was re-recorded as a ballad for Sandra's 2006 album Reflections.

=== Music video ===
The music video for the song was directed by DoRo (Rudi Dolezal and Hannes Rossacher). It pictures Sandra and Austrian model Rupert Weber as lovers in different periods of world history, beginning with Adam and Eve being tempted by a snake in the Garden of Eden. They then impersonate Cleopatra and her lover, continuing with, among others, a medieval couple, a woman saying good-bye to her husband embarking on a war as a Grande Armée soldier in the early 19th century, interwar gangster couple, 1940s lovers celebrating the end of war, 1960s hippies and flower children, 1970s punks, and 1980s contemporaries. Apart from the regular video set to the 7" edit of the song, an extended version exists which uses the 12" mix and additional making-of video footage. The extended version of the clip was only available on Sandra's VHS video compilation Ten on One (The Singles), released in 1987. The regular version was released on the 1992 video collection 18 Greatest Hits as well as the 2003 DVD The Complete History. In 2016, the extended version was uploaded to Sandra's official YouTube channel.

=== Formats and track listings ===
- 7" single (1987)

A. "Everlasting Love" – 3:49
B. "Change Your Mind" – 4:04

- 12" single (1987)

A. "Everlasting Love" (Extended Version) – 7:27
B1. "Change Your Mind" – 4:04
B2. "Everlasting Love" (Single Version) – 3:49

- 7" single (1988)

A. "Everlasting Love" (PWL 7") – 3:57
B. "Stop for a Minute" – 3:49

- 12" single (1988)

A1. "Everlasting Love" (PWL 12") – 7:46
A2. "Everlasting Love" (PWL 7") – 3:57
B1. "Everlasting Love" (PWL Dub) – 6:57
B2. "Stop for a Minute" – 3:49

- CD maxi single
1. "Everlasting Love" – 3:57
2. "Stop for a Minute" – 3:51
3. "Everlasting Love" (Remix) – 7:40
4. "(I'll Never Be) Maria Magdalena" – 3:58

=== Charts ===
==== Weekly charts ====
Weekly chart performance for Sandra's cover
Chart (1987–89)	Peak position
Australia (Kent Music Report)	72
Austria (Ö3 Austria Top 40)	6
Belgium (Ultratop 50 Flanders)	14
Canada Dance/Urban (RPM)	13
Denmark (IFPI)	10
Europe (European Hot 100 Singles)	6
France (SNEP)	12
Greece (IFPI)	2
Italy (Musica e dischi)	20
Netherlands (Dutch Top 40)	8
Netherlands (Single Top 100)	12
South Africa (Springbok Radio)	6
Spain (AFYVE)	17
Switzerland (Schweizer Hitparade)	5
UK Singles (OCC)	45
US Hot Dance Music/Maxi-Singles Sales (Billboard)	22
West Germany (Official German Charts)	5

2026 weekly chart performance for Sandra's cover
Chart (2026)	Peak position
Poland (Polish Airplay Top 100)	44

==== Year-end charts ====
1987 year-end chart performance for Sandra's cover
Chart (1987)	Position
Europe (European Hot 100 Singles)	66
Switzerland (Schweizer Hitparade)	30
West Germany (Media Control)	59

=== Certifications ===
Certifications for Everlasting Love
Region	Certification	Certified units/sales
Belgium (BRMA)	Gold	25,000^{*}
France (SNEP)	Silver	250,000^{*}
Germany (BVMI)	Gold	250,000^{^}
^{*} Sales figures based on certification alone.^{^} Shipments figures based on certification alone.

== Gloria Estefan version ==
"Everlasting Love"

Single by Gloria Estefan

from the album Hold Me, Thrill Me, Kiss Me
- B-side: "Don't Let the Sun Go Down on Me"
- Released: January 3, 1995
- Genre: Electropop; dance; hi-NRG
- Length: 4:01
- Label: Epic
- Songwriters: Mac Gayden; Buzz Cason

Gloria Estefan singles chronology
"Hold Me, Thrill Me, Kiss Me" (1994)	"Everlasting Love" (1995)	"It's Too Late" (1995)

Music video
- "Everlasting Love" on YouTube

"Everlasting Love" was recorded by Cuban-American singer and songwriter Gloria Estefan for her fifth studio album, Hold Me, Thrill Me, Kiss Me (1994), which comprised remakes of well-known hits. "Everlasting Love" was the second US single following "Turn the Beat Around" (in some territories, including the UK, "Hold Me, Thrill Me, Kiss Me" was the album's second single precedent to "Everlasting Love"). The single was first released in the US on January 3, 1995, and in the UK on February 6, 1995 by Epic Records.

"Everlasting Love" peaked at numbers 27 and 35 on the US Billboard Hot 100 and Cash Box Top 100 charts in March 1995 and also topped the Billboard Hot Dance Club Play chart. In the UK, "Everlasting Love" peaked at number 19 in February 1995. The single also peaked at number 12 in Iceland and number 16 in Scotland. As she had given birth to her daughter Emily a month prior to the song's release, Estefan did little promotion in support of the song, performing it only once on the February 19 UK broadcast of Top of the Pops. She would later go on to perform it on the Evolution World Tour in 1996. Australian music channel Max included Estefan's version in their list of "1000 Greatest Songs of All Time" in 2011.

=== Critical reception ===
Larry Flick from Billboard magazine described the song as "another dance-charged bauble", noting that it is given "a festive hi-NRG treatment that has clearly inspired Estefan to deliver one of her most relaxed and playful performances to date." In a separate review, he named it a "cheeky reading" that "has been transformed into a bouncy confection that will take you on a journey back to the hit-machine heyday of Stock Aitken Waterman." Steve Baltin from Cash Box stated, "It's a fool-proof hit, featuring basic love song lyrics and a very catchy hook. [...] A hit once again, both for the song and Estefan." Josef Woodard from Entertainment Weekly remarked that the singer's "easygoing charms still do the trick" on "Everlasting Love". Fell and Rufer from the Gavin Report felt that Estefan "remains in a retro mode for this up 'n' at 'ern version of a pop classic that's been a hit more than once before. This is a fully-involved production with more beats-per-minute than anything she's ever recorded. It's fun and can even be played by the few who avoided the first single, 'Turn the Beat Around'."

Chuck Campbell from Knoxville News Sentinel named it "a charismatic, twisting dance song". Alan Jones from Music Week said, "It is undoubtedly a great song and Gloria gives it her all, though the regular mix's uninspiring arrangement lets it down a little." John Kilgo from The Network Forty wrote that "it's hard to believe that it's been two decades since Carl Carlton bounced onto the Top 40 scene with this Top-10 tune. Now Estefan sprinkles her "Miami" spice on the classic, updating the dance number with a '90s sound." People Magazine described it as a "technofied take". Phil Shanklin of ReviewsRevues felt the singer "reactivates the track into a disco classic and it is so uplifting that I think her version is the best of all of them." Tony Cross from Smash Hits gave it two out of five, writing, "...though groovy, sounds a bit too familiar."

=== Music video ===
The accompanying music video for "Everlasting Love" was shot at the Sunset Studios in Hollywood, California. Estefan, pregnant with her second child at the time, could not appear in the video. The production team, which included co-directors Tony Minnelli and Paul Lynde along with Estefan, decided to give the video a twist. They selected some of the best drag talent from West Hollywood, California to star in the video. Five impersonators, three male and two female, appeared as Gloria Estefan, each representing a different stage in Estefan's career. Some notable video cast members include female impersonator Julian Viva, Hollywood Super Club Kids, and The Fabulous Wonder Twins. It also includes drag performers Venus D-Lite and Raja Gemini, who later appeared in season 3 of RuPaul's Drag Race. Estefan included cast members Julian Viva and Willie E. on her Evolution World Tour which began the following year.

Gloria Estefan went on to receive an award for Dance Clip of the Year at the Billboard Music Video Awards in November 1995. Cyndi Lauper has since insinuated that the idea of featuring drag performers in the clip was inspired by her own video "Hey Now (Girls Just Want to Have Fun)" released a few months earlier.

=== Formats and track listings ===
- US CD maxi single
1. "Everlasting Love" (Single Version) – 4:01
2. "Everlasting Love" (7-inch Remix) – 3:40
3. "Everlasting Love" (Classic Paradise Radio Mix) – 4:00
4. "Everlasting Love" (Alternate Mix) – 3:44
5. "Everlasting Love" (Classic Paradise Mix) – 8:51
6. "Don't Let the Sun Go Down on Me" – 6:06
- US 12-inch single

A1. "Everlasting Love" (Classic Paradise Mix) – 8:51
A2. "Everlasting Love" (Hacienda Mix) – 8:13
B1. "Everlasting Love" (Deep Love Dub) – 7:08
B2. "Everlasting Love" (Hacienda Dub) – 8:15
B3. "Everlasting Love" (Single Version) – 4:01

- UK CD maxi single
1. "Everlasting Love" (Classic Paradise Mix) – 8:53
2. "Everlasting Love" (Deep Love Mix) – 7:11
3. "Everlasting Love" (Hacienda Mix) – 8:15
4. "Everlasting Love" (Aphrodisiac Mix) – 7:16
- UK 12-inch single

A1. "Everlasting Love" (Classic Paradise Mix) – 8:05
A2. "Everlasting Love" (Moran's Marathon Love Mix) – 9:49
B1. "Everlasting Love" (Deep Love Mix) – 8:09
B2. "Everlasting Love" (Deep Love Dub) – 7:08
B3. "Everlasting Love" (Classic Paradise Dub) – 11:45

=== Charts ===
==== Weekly charts ====
Chart (1995)	Peak position
Australia (ARIA)	29
Canada Top Singles (RPM)	19
Europe (Eurochart Hot 100 Singles)	39
Europe (European Hit Radio)	24
Netherlands (Dutch Top 40 Tipparade)	8
Netherlands (Single Top 100)	43
New Zealand (Recorded Music NZ)	24
Scotland (OCC)	16
UK Singles (OCC)	19
UK Airplay (Music Week)	13
UK Dance (OCC)	30
UK Club Chart (Music Week)	42
US Billboard Hot 100	27
US Adult Contemporary (Billboard)	5
US Dance Club Play (Billboard)	1
US Dance Maxi-Singles Sales (Billboard)	10
US Pop Airplay (Billboard)	28
US Cash Box Top 100	35

==== Year-end charts ====
Chart (1995)	Position
US Adult Contemporary (Billboard)	25

=== Release history ===
Region	Date	Format(s)	Label(s)	Ref.
United States	January 3, 1995	12-inch vinyl; CD; cassette	Epic	
United Kingdom	February 6, 1995	12-inch vinyl; CD; cassette	Epic	

== Other notable cover versions ==
- In 1968, Australian band Town Criers recorded a cover of "Everlasting Love" for their debut album of the same name. The single reached no. 17 in Australia.
- Joe Dassin recorded the song in French in 1968 as "Plus Je Te Vois, Plus Je Te Veux" "(The More I See You, The More I Want You)" and reached no. 35 in the Francophone region of Belgium.
- "Everlasting Love" was covered by Australian singer Doug Parkinson in 1974. The single reached no. 22 in Australia.
- In 1977, Patricia Paay released a cover of the song on her album The Lady Is a Champ. The single reached no. 25 in Belgium.
- Narvel Felts recorded his version of the song in August 1978. It was released on his album One Run for the Roses and as a single in 1979, becoming a hit in country charts in the US and Canada.
- Louise Mandrell released her version of "Everlasting Love" in 1979 which was a minor country hit in the US.
- Joe Johnson, winner of the 1986 World Snooker Championship, released a cover of the song to celebrate winning the title.
- Irish rock band U2 recorded a cover and released it as the B-side to the 1989 single "All I Want Is You". It reached number 10 in the Netherlands and number 11 on the Billboard Modern Rock chart in the US.
- UK boy band Worlds Apart released a cover of "Everlasting Love" in September 1993, which reached no. 20 in the UK and no. 23 in Ireland. It was included on their 1994 debut album Together. In September 1994, the single was issued in Germany where it peaked at no. 40. A new version of "Everlasting Love" with lead vocals by Nathan Moore was included on the French edition of the second Worlds Apart album Everybody. This version charted at no. 4 in France.
- The cast from the BBC One TV series Casualty released a cover of "Everlasting Love" as a Children in Need charity single in 1998, with lead vocals performed by actress Rebecca Wheatley. The single reached no. 5 in the UK singles chart.
- Jamie Cullum recorded his cover of "Everlasting Love" in 2004 for the soundtrack to Bridget Jones: The Edge of Reason and special edition of his album Twentysomething. The single reached the top 20 in the UK, the Netherlands, and Denmark.
- Kerry Norton recorded the song for her album Young Heart. Her version charted at no. 97 in the Netherlands in October 2005.
- Willy Sommers recorded the song with Dutch lyrics as "Liefde Voor Altijd" "(Love Forever)" for his 2011 album 40 jaar hits (40 years of hits). The song peaked at no. 18 in the Flemish region of Belgium.
