= Mirrors (Sandra album) =

1986 studio album by Sandra

Studio album by Sandra
- Released: 13 October 1986
- Recorded: 1986
- Genre: Pop; synth-pop
- Length: 34:49
- Label: Virgin
- Producer: Michael Cretu; Armand Volker

Sandra chronology
The Long Play (1985)	Mirrors (1986)	Ten on One (The Singles) (1987)

Singles from Mirrors
- 1. "Innocent Love" Released: June 1986; 2. "Hi! Hi! Hi!" Released: September 1986; 3. "Loreen" Released: November 1986; 4. "Midnight Man" Released: February 1987

Mirrors is the second studio album by the German pop singer Sandra, released on 13 October 1986 by Virgin Records. The album spawned the European Top 10 singles "Innocent Love" and "Hi! Hi! Hi!".

== Background ==
Mirrors was produced by Michael Cretu and Armand Volker, and continued the synth-pop-oriented style introduced on Sandra's debut album, The Long Play, released the year before. The material was arranged with the use of such synthesizers as Akai S900, PPG, Linn 9000, Prophet 2002, Oberheim Matrix-12, EMS Vocoder, Yamaha DX7 and Roland Super Jupiter. Mirrors saw more songwriting and singing involvement from Hubert Kemmler, who was already a popular singer in Germany under the name of Hubert Kah. The song "Don't Cry (The Breakup of the World)" was written in reaction to the 1986 Chernobyl disaster.

Four singles were released from this album. "Innocent Love" was the lead single and reached the top 10 in multiple European countries, followed by "Hi! Hi! Hi!", which was a top-10 entry in Sandra's native Germany, as well as Greece and Spain. The ballad "Loreen" and the uptempo "Midnight Man" served as the album's third and fourth singles, respectively, and both achieved a moderate success across Europe.

The album charted within the top 20 in Germany, Switzerland, Finland and Norway.

== Track listing ==
Side one
No.	Title	Lyrics	Music	Length
1.	"The Second Day"		Michael Cretu; Hubert Kemmler; Klaus Hirschburger	0:37
2.	"Don't Cry (The Breakup of the World)"	Kemmler; Hirschburger	Kemmler; Cretu	4:49
3.	"Hi! Hi! Hi!"	Cretu; Hirschburger	Cretu; Kemmler	4:08
4.	"Midnight Man"	Kemmler; Hirschburger	Kemmler; Cretu	3:04
5.	"You'll Be Mine"	Cretu; Hirschburger	Cretu; Kemmler	4:33

Side two
No.	Title	Lyrics	Music	Length
6.	"Innocent Love"	Susanne Müller; Hirschburger	Kemmler; Ulrich Herter	5:23
7.	"Two Lovers Tonight"	Cretu; Hirschburger	Marc Cassandra; Reinhard Besser	3:45
8.	"Mirror of Love"	Kemmler; Hirschburger	Kemmler; Cretu	4:13
9.	"Loreen"	Frank Peter; Hirschburger	Peter; Cretu	4:17
Total length:				34:49

Note:

- The Canadian edition includes the single version of "(I'll Never Be) Maria Magdalena" as the opening track and combines "The Second Day" and "Don't Cry (The Breakup of the World)" into one track.

== Personnel ==
Credits adapted from the liner notes of Mirrors.

- Sandra – lead vocals
- Michael Cretu – production, arrangements, performance, background vocals
- Armand Volker – production
- Hubert Kemmler – background vocals
- Peter Ries – background vocals
- Tissy Thiers – background vocals
- Timothy Touchton – voice on "The Second Day"
- Mike Schmidt – cover
- Dieter Eikelpoth – photography

== Charts ==
Chart performance for Mirrors
Chart (1986–1987)	Peak position
Argentine Albums (CAPIF)	9
European Albums (Music & Media)	37
Finnish Albums (Suomen virallinen lista)	15
German Albums (Offizielle Top 100)	16
Norwegian Albums (VG-lista)	14
Swedish Albums (Sverigetopplistan)	40
Swiss Albums (Schweizer Hitparade)	13

== Certifications ==
Certifications for Mirrors
Region	Certification	Certified units/sales
Switzerland (IFPI Switzerland)	Gold	25,000^{^}
^{^} Shipments figures based on certification alone.
