= Steve Ellis (singer) =

English pop and rock singer (1950–2026)

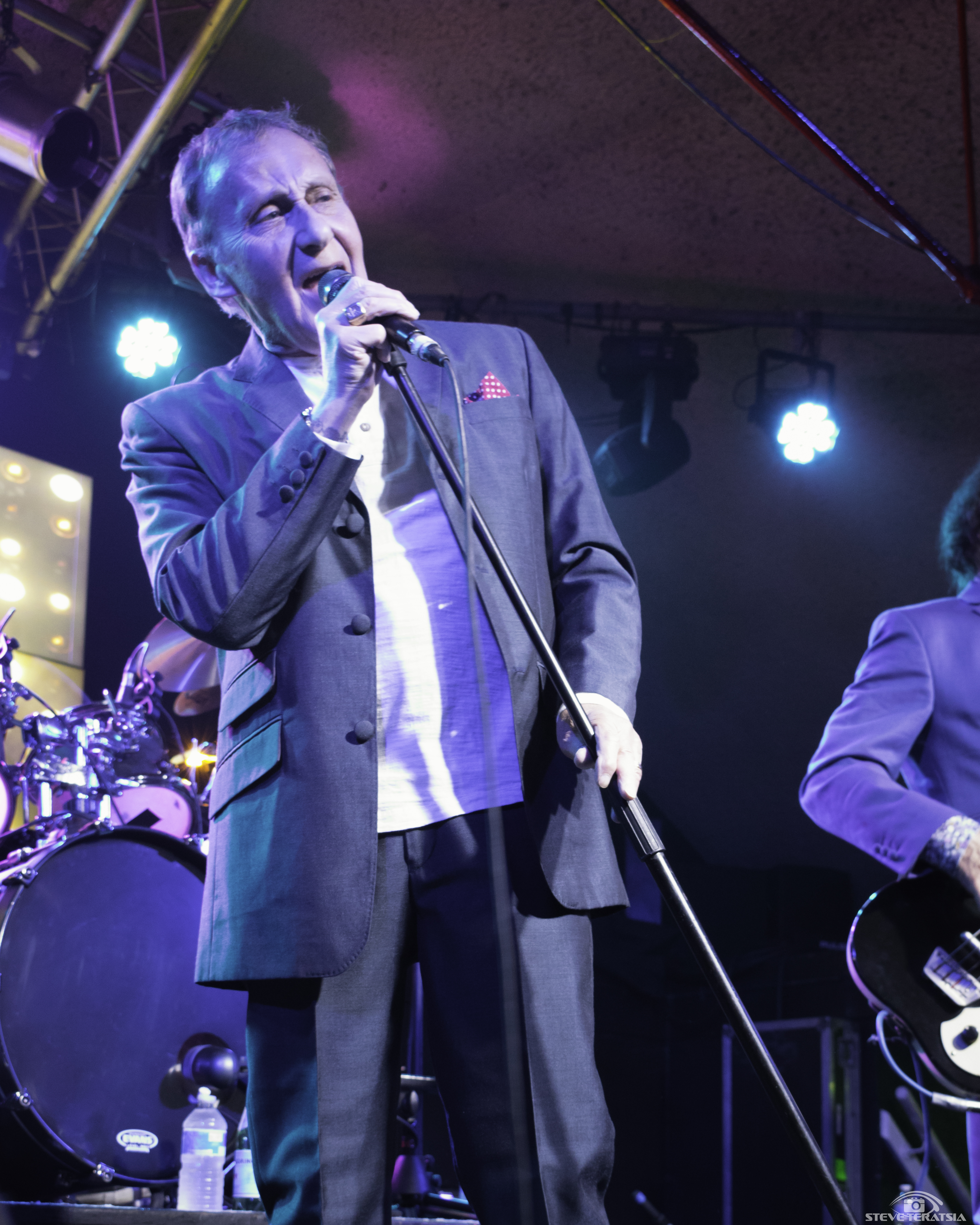
- Ellis in 2022

Background information
- Born: Stephen John Ellis; 7 April 1950; Edgware, Middlesex, England
- Died: 30 October 2026 (aged 76)
- Genres: Rock; pop
- Occupation: Singer
- Instrument: Vocals
- Years active: 1965–2026
- Labels: Ariola; Steam; Red Rock; Demon; Angel Air; Sony
- Formerly of: Love Affair; Widowmaker; Ellis
- Website: steveellis.co.uk

Stephen John Ellis (7 April 1950 – 30 October 2026) was an English rock and pop singer. His biggest success was with the band Love Affair in the late 1960s.

== Early life ==
Stephen John Ellis was born in Edgware, Middlesex, on 7 April 1950. His first band was called the Clifton Bystanders. When his career as a professional musician took off, he was working part-time at a Co-op.

== Career ==
=== Love Affair ===
When Ellis left the Clifton Bystanders, he formed his first band as the lead vocalist, which was called Soul Survivors, formed when he was fifteen. The Soul Survivors formed into Love Affair in 1966, with Rex Brayley, Mick Jackson, Lynton Guest, and Maurice Bacon. A few months later, in early 1967, the band released their first two singles, including "Everlasting Love", a song that knocked the Beatles' "Hello, Goodbye" off the number-one spot on the UK singles chart. Love Affair would go on to have more commercial success, with songs such as "A Day Without Love", "Rainbow Valley", and "Bringing on Back the Good Times".

In 1967, Ellis and the band were arrested for climbing the Shaftesbury Memorial Fountain at Piccadilly Circus. They were each fined £12 for the crime. Ellis later felt that Love Affair had run its course, and he left in December 1969 for a solo career: "We never really made it big anywhere but Britain and I think that if we had started to happen in America, I wouldn't have left."

=== Widowmaker ===
Ellis subsequently had limited chart success with the rock band Widowmaker, releasing their debut studio album Widowmaker in 1976. Widowmaker toured the UK with Nazareth, and in June 1976 joined the stadium tour, The Who Put the Boot In opening for leading rock acts such as Little Feat, the Sensational Alex Harvey Band, Streetwalkers and the headline act the Who. Ellis left the band after touring with Electric Light Orchestra (ELO), and with a new lead vocalist (John Butler), released their second and final studio album, Too Late to Cry in 1977.

=== Later career ===
In 1972, he formed the band Ellis, a short-lived partnership with the keyboardist Zoot Money. Other members included ex-Peter Bardens' guitarist Andy Gee; ex-Fat Mattress' bassist Jimmy Leverton, later replaced by Nick South; and drummer Dave Lutton. The band released two studio albums, Riding on the Crest of a Slump in 1972, and Why Not? the following year. In 1976, one of the most popular Serbian and ex-Yugoslav bands, Smak, covered his song "El Doomo" under the title "El dumo", and achieved great success with it.

Ellis also sang on the soundtrack of Loot, a 1970 film based on Joe Orton's 1965 play, directed by the Canadian film and television director Silvio Narizzano.

He was performing briefly with New Amen Corner during 2013 and had an album with appearances by the Jam's Paul Weller and the Who's Roger Daltrey out on Demon Records in 2008, titled The Best of Days.

== Personal life and death ==
Ellis lived in Brighton, England. He was influenced by the rock and roll of the 1950s, but was mainly inspired by rhythm and blues music.

Ellis died on 30 October 2026, aged 76.

== Discography ==
Love Affair

Widowmaker

- Album: Widowmaker (1976)
- Single: "On the Road"/"Pin a Rose on Me" (1976)
- Single: "When I Met You"/"Pin a Rose on Me" (1976)
- Single: "Pin a Rose on Me"/"On the Road" (1976)

Solo

- Album: Boom Bang Twang (2018)
