= Close to Seven =

1992 studio album by Sandra

Studio album by Sandra
- Released: 17 February 1992
- Recorded: 1991
- Studios: A.R.T. (Ibiza, Spain)
- Genre: Pop
- Length: 43:46
- Label: Virgin
- Producer: Michael Cretu

Sandra chronology
Paintings in Yellow (1990)	Close to Seven (1992)	18 Greatest Hits (1992)

Singles from Close To Seven
- 1. "Don't Be Aggressive" Released: January 1992; 2. "I Need Love" Released: April 1992

"I Need Love" single cover

Close to Seven is the fifth studio album by German singer Sandra, released on 17 February 1992 by Virgin Records.

== Background ==
The album's title symbolised the upcoming seventh anniversary of Sandra's career. It was recorded in Sandra and Michael Cretu's home studio in Ibiza, Spain, and continued a development towards a more meditative, less dance-oriented musical style, echoing material that Sandra and Michael recorded together for the Enigma project. The male vocals were performed by Andy Jonas, also known as Andy "Angel" Hart.

Close to Seven increased the alternative and experimental influences Sandra always had in her previous music, and for the most part departs the synth-pop sound of her previous releases and instead features a harder pop-rock edge. Sandra experimenting with the genres of her music would become more prominent in her coming projects.

"Don't Be Aggressive" was released as the first single from the album in January 1992, reaching the top 10 in Finland and Norway, and the top 20 in Sandra's native Germany. "I Need Love" followed as the second and final commercial single in April 1992, but was a commercial failure, becoming Sandra's first single since 1984 to fail to enter the charts. "Steady Me" was issued in June 1992 as a promotional single only in Germany. The album also contained "Shadows", a cover version of Michael Cretu's song "Shadows Over My Head" from his 1979 solo album Moon, Light & Flowers.

Although Close to Seven did not sell as well as its predecessors, it was a commercial success and got to number seven in Germany. It also reached the top 20 in Switzerland and Norway.

== Track listing ==
1. "Don't Be Aggressive" (Michael Cretu, Klaus Hirschburger) – 4:45
2. "Mirrored in Your Eyes" (Michael Cretu, Peter Cornelius, Klaus Hirschburger) – 3:26
3. "I Need Love" (Michael Cretu, Klaus Hirschburger) – 3:24
4. "No Taboo" (Michael Cretu, David Fairstein) – 3:50
5. "When the Rain Doesn't Come" (Michael Cretu, Sandra Cretu) – 4:43
6. "Steady Me" (Michael Cretu, Peter Cornelius, Klaus Hirschburger) – 3:57
7. "Shadows" (Michael Cretu, Klaus Hirschburger) – 3:50
8. "Seal It Forever" (Michael Cretu, Klaus Hirschburger) – 4:51
9. "Love Turns to Pain" (Michael Cretu, Klaus Hirschburger) – 4:59
10. "Your Way to India" (Michael Cretu, Klaus Hirschburger) – 6:01

== Personnel ==
- Arranged, engineered and produced by Michael Cretu
- Guitars by Tom Leonhard
- Backing vocals by Andy "Angel" Hard
- Photography by Jim Rakete
- Cover art by HP Uertz and Lmp

== Charts ==
Chart performance for Close to Seven
Chart (1992)	Peak position
Austrian Albums (Ö3 Austria)	26
Dutch Albums (Album Top 100)	87
European Albums (Music & Media)	24
French Albums (IFOP)	18
German Albums (Offizielle Top 100)	7
Norwegian Albums (VG-lista)	20
Swedish Albums (Sverigetopplistan)	27
Swiss Albums (Schweizer Hitparade)	13
