= Hiroshima (song) =

1971 single by Wishful Thinking

Single by Wishful Thinking

from the album Hiroshima
- B-side: "She Belongs to the Night"
- Released: 1971
- Length: 4:42
- Label: Global, Atlantic
- Songwriter: Dave Morgan
- Producer: Lou Reizner

Wishful Thinking singles chronology
"Without a Place to Go" (1970)	"Hiroshima" (1971)	"Lu La Le Lu" (1972)

"Hiroshima" is an anti-war song performed by British band Wishful Thinking, written by David Morgan and produced by Lou Reizner, which tells about the atomic bombing of Hiroshima. The track was recorded at the Chappell Recording Studios in London in 1970. It was first released in 1971 as a single from their album of the same name, but achieved commercial success only upon its re-release in 1978, when it peaked at No. 8 in West Germany, staying on the chart for 44 weeks. It was one of the best-selling singles of 1978 in West Germany.

== Track listing ==
- 7-inch single

A. "Hiroshima" – 4:42
B. "She Belongs to the Night" – 2:47

== Charts ==
=== Weekly charts ===
Chart (1978)	Peak position
West Germany (GfK)	8

=== Year-end charts ===
Chart (1978)	Position
West Germany (Media Control)	9

== Sandra version ==
"Hiroshima"

Single by Sandra

from the album Paintings in Yellow
- B-side: "La vista de luna"
- Released: 29 January 1990
- Length: 6:50 (album version); 4:11 (single version)
- Label: Virgin
- Songwriter: David Morgan
- Producer: Michael Cretu

Sandra singles chronology
"Around My Heart" (1989)	"Hiroshima" (1990)	"(Life May Be) A Big Insanity" (1990)

Music video
- "Hiroshima" on YouTube

German singer Sandra covered "Hiroshima" and released her version as a single in January 1990, with production by Michael Cretu. Sandra decided to cover the anti-war "Hiroshima" out of her concern about the political unrest happening in countries like Lebanon, China and Romania in the late 1980s. It was the first song recorded for her fourth album Paintings in Yellow and was released as the LP's lead single in February 1990.

Sandra's cover was commercially successful, particularly in Germany and Switzerland, where it reached the top five and remains one of Sandra's highest-charting singles. In Switzerland, it also peaked at No. 11 on the airplay chart. The music video for the song was directed by Roland Willaert. The clip was released on Sandra's VHS video compilation 18 Greatest Hits in 1992 and the 2003 DVD The Complete History.

In 1999, a remix of the song was released on Sandra's compilation My Favourites. The track was remixed again for her 2006 compilation Reflections.

=== Critical reception ===
Music & Media wrote, "A slow, moody number that is spoilt by the obviousness of the production but is, in fact, a charming song with a fine melody."

=== Track listings ===
- 7-inch single

A. "Hiroshima" – 4:11
B. "La vista de luna" – 3:44

- 12-inch single

A. "Hiroshima" (extended version) – 6:44
B1. "Hiroshima" (dub mix) – 3:08
B2. "Heaven Can Wait" (US remix) – 7:11

- CD maxi single
1. "Hiroshima" (single version) – 4:11
2. "Hiroshima" (extended version) – 6:44
3. "Hiroshima" (dub mix) – 3:08
4. "Heaven Can Wait" (US remix) – 7:11

=== Charts ===
==== Weekly charts ====
Chart (1990)	Peak position
Europe (Eurochart Hot 100 Singles)	15
France (SNEP)	16
Switzerland (Schweizer Hitparade)	4
West Germany (GfK)	4

==== Year-end charts ====
Chart (1990)	Position
Europe (Eurochart Hot 100 Singles)	70
Germany (Media Control)	33
Switzerland (Schweizer Hitparade)	29

== Other cover versions ==
- In 1982, East German band Puhdys released a single with a German-language version of the song. The cover appeared on their album Computer-Karriere.
- The song was also covered by German power metal band Freedom Call and included in the special edition of their first live album Live Invasion (2004).
