= A Day Without Love =

1968 single by the Love Affair

- Cover of the single released in the Netherlands

Single by the Love Affair

from the album The Everlasting Love Affair
- B-side: "I'm Happy"
- Released: 30 August 1968
- Recorded: 1968
- Genre: Pop
- Length: 3:48
- Label: CBS
- Songwriter: Philip Goodhand-Tait
- Producers: Mike Smith; John Goodison

The Love Affair singles chronology
"Rainbow Valley" (1968)	"A Day Without Love" (1968)	"One Road" (1969)

"A Day Without Love" is a song by the British band the Love Affair, released as their fourth single in August 1968. It continued the band's success, becoming their third consecutive top-ten hit in the UK.

== Reception ==
Reviewing the song for New Musical Express, Derek Johnson wrote "I think the Love Affair have done it again! Certainly the group has acquired the happy knack of turning out wholesome pop records with a strong commercial appeal and this disc maintains the standard". He also described it as "a stimulating, up-beat number that storms along at a dynamic pace, and exudes a terrific atmosphere of vitality". Peter Jones for Record Mirror wrote that "it could be their strongest yet", describing it as "a good and commercial song, with a rather romantic, but tough, edge to it".

== Personnel ==
- Steve Ellis – lead vocals
- Big Jim Sullivan – guitar
- Herbie Flowers – bass
- Clem Cattini – drums
- Lesley Duncan – backing vocals
- Sue Glover – backing vocals
- Sunny Leslie – backing vocals

== Charts ==
Chart (1968)	Peak position
Australia (Kent Music Report)	57
Austria (Ö3 Austria Top 40)	17
Ireland (IRMA)	9
New Zealand (Listener)	6
South Africa (Springbok Radio)	15
Sweden (Tio i Topp)	9
UK Melody Maker Pop 30	8
UK New Musical Express Top 30	9
UK Record Retailer Top 50	6
