= Bringing on Back the Good Times =

Single by the Love Affair
- B-side: "Another Day"
- Released: 4 July 1969
- Genre: Pop
- Length: 3:21
- Label: CBS
- Songwriters: Phillip Goodhand-Tait; J. Cokell
- Producer: Mike Smith

The Love Affair singles chronology
"One Road" (1969)	"Bringing on Back the Good Times" (1969)	"Baby I Know" (1969)

"Bringing on Back the Good Times" is a song by the British band the Love Affair. The song was released internationally in early July 1969. It became a Top 10 hit in the United Kingdom, New Zealand and Israel and was also a minor hit in Canada for 'Fast Eddy' in 1971.

== Chart history ==
The Love Affair

Chart (1969)	Peak position
New Zealand (Listener)	10
UK (The Official Charts Company)	9
Israel (Kol Israel)	9

'Fast Eddy'

Chart (1971)	Peak position
Canada RPM Top Singles	75
