= (Life May Be) A Big Insanity =

Single by Sandra

from the album Paintings in Yellow
- B-side: "The Skin I'm In"
- Released: May 1990
- Genre: Synthpop, Euro house, New jack swing
- Length: 4:29
- Label: Virgin
- Songwriters: Michael Cretu, Klaus Hirschburger
- Producer: Michael Cretu

Sandra singles chronology
"Hiroshima" (1990)	"(Life May Be) A Big Insanity" (1990)	"One More Night" (1990)

Licensed audio
- "[Life May Be] A Big Insanity" on YouTube

"(Life May Be) A Big Insanity" is a 1990 pop song performed by German singer Sandra, written by Michael Cretu and Klaus Hirschburger, and produced by Cretu. It was released in spring 1990 as the second single from Sandra's fourth studio album, Paintings in Yellow. The single became only a moderate hit in Germany and France.

The music video for the song was directed by Howard Greenhalgh. The clip was released on Sandra's VHS video compilation 18 Greatest Hits in 1992 and the 2003 DVD The Complete History.

== Formats and track listings ==
- 7" single

A. "(Life May Be) A Big Insanity" – 4:29
B. "The Skin I'm In" – 3:40

- 12" single

A1. "(Life May Be) A Big Insanity" (Radio Edit) – 4:29
A2. "(Life May Be) A Big Insanity" (Club Mix) – 6:12
B1. "(Life May Be) A Big Insanity" (Dance Mix) – 6:39
B2. "(Life May Be) A Big Insanity" (Dub Mix) – 2:33

- CD maxi single
1. "(Life May Be) A Big Insanity" (Radio Edit) – 4:29
2. "(Life May Be) A Big Insanity" (Club Mix) – 6:12
3. "(Life May Be) A Big Insanity" (Dance Mix) – 6:39
4. "(Life May Be) A Big Insanity" (Dub Mix) – 2:33
5. "The Skin I'm In" (Single Version) – 3:40

== Charts ==
Chart (1990)	Peak position
Europe (Eurochart Hot 100 Singles)	95
France (SNEP)	41
Germany (Official German Charts)	27
