= Phillip Goodhand-Tait =

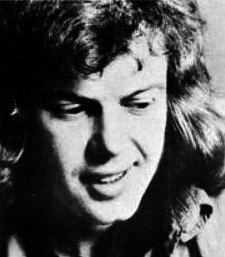
- Goodhand-Tait in 1971

Background information
- Born: 3 January 1945 (age 81); Kingston upon Hull, East Riding of Yorkshire, England
- Occupations: Musician; songwriter; record producer
- Years active: 1960s–present
- Website: pg-t.com

Phillip Goodhand-Tait (born 3 January 1945) is an English singer-songwriter, record producer and keyboardist.

== Life and career ==
Goodhand-Tait was born in Hull, East Riding of Yorkshire. Known as Phil Tait in his school years, his mother was a piano teacher and his father was involved in trade unions. Goodhand-Tait began his music career shortly after the family moved to Guildford, Surrey, in 1957. His first group, Phill Tone and the Vibrants, was renamed Phill and the Stormsville Shakers in 1961. The band included Paul Demers on drums, Ivor Shackleton on guitar, and Kirk Riddle on bass.

By 1966, the same year the group released its first singles, the Stormsville Shakers's lineup included Tait, Riddle, Ian Jelfs on guitar, David Sherrington on tenor sax, and Alan Bunn on drums. That same year, Mel Collins was recruited on second tenor sax. In 1967, the band's name changed to Circus, releasing further singles sides. January 1969 saw Goodhand-Tait exit the group to pursue a solo career, leaving Jelfs, Collins, Riddle, and new drummer Chris Burrows to write, record and release the self-titled pop-jazz album Circus, after which they disbanded in 1970.

In September 1971 Goodhand-Tait released the album I Think I'll Write a Song. On the album appear guitarist Andrew Latimer, drummer Andy Ward and bassist Doug Ferguson. They auditioned to be the backing band for Phillip. They were a trio named Brew, formed in Guildford, Surrey. After the album with Goodhand-Tait the three formed Camel, along with keyboardist Peter Bardens.

Goodhand-Tait wrote and recorded songs that have been covered by Roger Daltrey ("Oceans Away", "Parade", and "Leon"), Euson ("Leon"), Gene Pitney ("You Are" and "Oceans Away"), Zoot Money ("No One But You"), and Love Affair ("Bringing on Back the Good Times", "A Day Without Love", "Lincoln County", "One Road" and "Baby I Know").

In 1971, Goodhand-Tait wrote the soundtrack for the film Universal Soldier. In 1976, he played the harmonium on Chris De Burgh's album, Spanish Train and Other Stories.

Goodhand-Tait has also produced live albums by Magnum, Venom, Climax Blues Band, Kid Creole and the Coconuts and The Lords of the New Church.

In 2021, Goodhand-Tait's DJM output was released on CD for the first time in the UK, after being out of print for many years. The box set, titled Gone Are The Songs of Yesterday and released by Cherry Red Records, includes Rehearsal, I Think I'll Write a Song, Songfall, and Phillip Goodhand-Tait as well as bonus material including singles, B-sides, and previously unreleased songs featured in Universal Soldier. The albums concurrently made their debut on streaming platforms such as Spotify.

== Solo discography ==
=== Studio albums ===
- Rehearsal – 1971 – DJM
- I Think I'll Write a Song – 1971 – DJM
- Songfall – 1972 – DJM
- Phillip Goodhand-Tait – 1973 – DJM
- Oceans Away – 1976 – Chrysalis
- Teaching an Old Dog New Tricks – 1977 – Chrysalis
- Good Old Phil's – 1980 – Gundog

Ricky-Tick...40 years on -2005 - Span TV

- An Evening With Peggy Sue – 2006 – Span TV
- The Last Laugh – 2008 – Span TV

=== Compilation albums ===
- Jingle-Jangle Man – 1975 – DJM

=== Live albums ===
- Radio Songs: 1977 Recordings from Radio Bremen – 2010 – Span TV (original) Angel Air (2011 re-release)
- Age of Bewilderment Vol. 1 – with David Sherrington (live album) – 2012 – Span TV
- Age of Bewilderment Vol. 2 – with David Sherrington (live album) – 2012 – Span TV

=== Original UK singles ===
- "Love Has Got Hold of Me" / "Too Pleased to Help" (Decca F12868 – 1969)
- "Jeannie" / "Run See The Sun" (DJM Records DJS 10230 – 1970)
- "Everyday" / "I Think I'll Write A Song" (DJM Records DJS 10261 – 1971)
- "Oh Rosanna" / "I Didn't Know Myself" (DJM Records DJS 10236 – 1971)
- "City Streets" / "Moon" (DJM Records) DJS 10268 – 1972)
- "You Are" / "Five Flight Walk Up" (DJM Records DJS 102978 – 1974)
- "Almost Killed A Man" / "Reach Out For Each Other" (DJM Records DJS 295 – 1974)
- "I Think I Can Believe" / "One More Rodeo" (DJM Records DJS 319 – 1974)
- "Sweet Emotion" / "Jesus Didn't Only Love The Cowboys" (DJM Records DJS 10601 – 1974)
- "Oceans Away" / "Can You Demonstrate" (Chrysalis Records CHS 2100 – 1976)
- "Jewel" / "Old Fashioned Love" (Chrysalis Records CHS2134 – 1977)
- "Don't Treat Your Lover Like A Thief" / "If We Ever Meet Again" (Chrysalis Records CHS 2169 – 1977)
- "Angeltown" / "If We Ever Meet Again" (Chrysalis Records CHS 2183 – 1977)
- "Fly Me To The Sun" / "Sunshine On Ice" (Gundog Records GUNS 2 – 1980)
- "Wolfgang" (Span TV Records SPTVS1 – 2018)

=== International exclusive singles ===
- "Medicine Man" / "Sunrise Sunset" (DJM Records/Hansa 10967 – 1971) [Germany]
- "Sugar Train" / "Forever Kind of Love" (20th Century Records TC-2059 – 1973) [United States]
- "Leon" / "Everyday" (DJM Records 6102 320 – 1974) [Netherlands]
- "Warm Summer Rain" / "One More Rodeo" (DJM Records 6102 325 – 1974) [Netherlands]
- "Sugar Train" / "Reach Out For Each Other" (DJM Records 6102 331 – 1974) [Netherlands}
- "Heartbeat" / "Radio Play That Song Again" (Instant Records IS1501 – 1983) [Germany]
- "He'll Have to Go" / "Fly Me To The Sun" (Instant Records IS1506 – 1983) [Germany]
