= Midnight Man (Sandra song) =

Single by Sandra

from the album Mirrors
- B-side: "Mirror of Love"
- Released: February 23, 1987
- Recorded: October 13, 1986
- Genre: Europop
- Length: 3:02: 5:25 (Extended Version)
- Label: Virgin
- Songwriters: Hubert Kemmler, Michael Cretu, Klaus Hirschburger
- Producers: Michael Cretu, Armand Volker

Sandra singles chronology
"Loreen" (1986)	"Midnight Man" (1987)	"Everlasting Love" (1987)

Licensed audio
- "Midnight Man" on YouTube

"Midnight Man" is a 1986 pop song by German singer Sandra. It was written by Hubert Kemmler, Michael Cretu and Klaus Hirschburger, and produced by Cretu and Armand Volker. The song was released as the fourth and final single with added synthesizers from Sandra's second album Mirrors in early 1987, and was a moderate chart success in Germany and Belgium.

The music video for the song was directed by Wolfgang Simon and Michael von Almsick. The clip was included on Sandra's VHS video compilations Ten on One (The Singles) and 18 Greatest Hits, released in 1987 and 1992, respectively, as well as the 2003 DVD The Complete History.

== Formats and track listings ==
- 7" single

A. "Midnight Man" – 3:03
B. "Mirror of Love" – 4:13

- 12" single

A. "Midnight Man" (Extended Version) – 5:26
B. "Mirror of Love" – 4:13

== Charts ==
Chart (1987)	Peak position
Belgium (Ultratop 50 Flanders)	34
Europe (European Hot 100 Singles)	77
Germany (Official German Charts)	24
Spain (AFYVE)	50
