= Hi! Hi! Hi! =

1986 single by Sandra

- 7-inch single

Single by Sandra

from the album Mirrors
- B-side: "You'll Be Mine"
- Released: September 1986
- Length: 4:08 (album version); 3:30 (single edit); 6:09 (extended version)
- Label: Virgin
- Songwriters: Michael Cretu; Hubert Kemmler; Klaus Hirschburger
- Producers: Michael Cretu; Armand Volker

Sandra singles chronology
"Innocent Love" (1986)	"Hi! Hi! Hi!" (1986)	"Loreen" (1986)

Alternative cover
- 12" single

Licensed audio
- "Hi! Hi! Hi!" on YouTube

"Hi! Hi! Hi!" is a song performed by the German pop singer Sandra. It was written by Michael Cretu, Hubert Kemmler and Klaus Hirschburger, and produced by Cretu and Armand Volker. The song was released as the second single from Sandra's second solo studio album, Mirrors, in autumn 1986. It was commercially successful, reaching the top 10 in West Germany and the top 20 in Austria, France and Switzerland. A new remix of the song was included on Sandra's retrospective album Reflections (2006).

== Music video ==
The music video for the song was directed by DoRo (Rudi Dolezal and Hannes Rossacher). The clip was released on Sandra's VHS video compilations Ten on One (The Singles) and 18 Greatest Hits, released in 1987 and 1992, respectively, as well as the 2003 DVD The Complete History.

== Track listings ==
- 7-inch single

A. "Hi! Hi! Hi!" – 3:31
B. "You'll Be Mine" – 4:33

- 12-inch single

A. "Hi! Hi! Hi!" (extended version) – 6:12
B1. "You'll Be Mine" – 4:33
B2. "Hi! Hi! Hi!" – 3:31

== Charts ==
Weekly chart performance for "Hi! Hi! Hi!"
Chart (1986)	Peak position
Austria (Ö3 Austria Top 40)	12
Europe (European Hot 100 Singles)	23
Europe (European Airplay Top 50)	45
France (SNEP)	13
Greece (IFPI)	2
Netherlands (Single Top 100)	47
South Africa (Springbok Radio)	4
Spain (AFYVE)	36
Switzerland (Schweizer Hitparade)	20
West Germany (GfK)	7
