= Loreen (song) =

Single by Sandra

from the album Mirrors
- B-side: "Don't Cry (The Breakup of the World)"
- Released: November 24, 1986
- Recorded: 1986
- Genre: Pop
- Length: 4:17
- Label: Virgin
- Songwriters: Frank Peterson, Michael Cretu, Klaus Hirschburger
- Producers: Michael Cretu, Armand Volker

Sandra singles chronology
| "Hi! Hi! Hi!" (1986) | "Loreen" (1986) | "Midnight Man" (1987) |

Licensed audio
- "Loreen" on YouTube

"Loreen" is a 1986 pop song by German singer Sandra. It was written by Frank Peterson, Michael Cretu and Klaus Hirschburger, and produced by Cretu and Armand Volker. The song was released in November 1986 as the third single from Sandra's second album Mirrors. The contents of the 7" and the 12" single are identical, with "Loreen" being the only Sandra single from the 1980s or 1990s to lack an extended version. The song was a moderate success in Germany and Switzerland.

The music video for the song was directed by Kai von Kotze. The clip was included on Sandra's VHS video compilations Ten on One (The Singles) and 18 Greatest Hits, released in 1987 and 1992, respectively, as well as the 2003 DVD The Complete History.

== Formats and track listings ==
- 7" single

A. "Loreen" – 4:17
B. "Don't Cry (The Breakup of the World)" – 4:49

- 12" single

A. "Loreen" – 4:17
B. "Don't Cry (The Breakup of the World)" – 4:49

== Charts ==
| Chart (1986–1987) | Peak position |
|---|---|
| Germany (Official German Charts) | 23 |
| Switzerland (Schweizer Hitparade) | 29 |
