= Mac Gayden =

American singer (1941–2025)

- Birth name: McGavock Dickinson Gayden
- Born: June 5, 1941; Nashville, Tennessee, U.S.
- Died: April 16, 2025 (aged 83); Nashville, Tennessee, U.S.
- Genres: R&B; pop; folk; roots
- Occupations: Singer; songwriter; record producer
- Instruments: Guitar; slide guitar; banjo
- Years active: 1960s–20??
- Labels: Wild Child Records
- Formerly of: Area Code 615; Barefoot Jerry

McGavock Dickinson Gayden (June 5, 1941 – April 16, 2025) was an American rock and country singer, songwriter, musician, and record producer working in Nashville during the latter half of the 20th century. As a session guitarist, Gayden was featured on Bob Dylan's album Blonde On Blonde , but was inadvertently left off the album's credits. He co-wrote "Everlasting Love", his most successful song. It became an enduring hit, recorded by other artists at least two dozen times over a 60 year span and achieved top-40 status worldwide. He was president of Wild Child Records, formed in 2004. In 2013, he was honored by the Country Music Hall of Fame as one of the "Nashville Cats".

== Background ==
Mac Gayden was born in Nashville, Tennessee on June 5, 1941. He played with Charlie McCoy and the Escorts and that group started playing many sessions in Nashville. In the late 1960s, he helped establish two critically acclaimed bands. These were Area Code 615 (signed with Polydor) and Barefoot Jerry (signed with Capitol Records); in which Gayden wrote the songs, played guitars and sang. Gayden left Barefoot Jerry in 1971 to record his first solo album with producer Bob Johnston whom he had worked with on Bob Dylan's Blonde on Blonde album. Johnston asked to produce the solo album by Gayden entitled McGavock Gayden (EMI). Gayden formed his own band, "Skyboat" in 1972 and recorded two albums for ABC Records. He also served as producer of an album by Dianne Davidson (Baby) and one by Steve Young (To Satisfy You). Gayden recorded as a session guitar player with J.J. Cale, John Hiatt, Bob Dylan, Linda Ronstadt, Simon and Garfunkel, Kris Kristofferson, Steve Young, Rita Coolidge, Joe Simon, The Valentines, Elvis Presley, Ian and Sylvia, Jerry Jeff Walker, Loudon Wainwright, Connie Francis, The Alarm, Pearls before Swine, Ivory Joe Hunter, Robert Knight ("Everlasting Love"), Clifford Curry ("She Shot A Hole in My Soul"), Bobby Vinton and more. Gayden recorded frequently with Billy Sherrill who produced many hits.

When he was five he started to compose a song on his grandmother's piano ("Everlasting Love"). Later, when he heard Robert Knight's voice while he was performing at a fraternity house at Vanderbilt next to the one Knight's band was playing in, he ran over, introduced himself, and told Knight he had a song for him. Gayden got together with Knight and began pulling in the pieces of the song. He also brought in his friend, Buzz Cason. He and Cason produced "Everlasting Love." It was Robert Knight's first hit, followed by another song Gayden wrote, "My Rainbow Valley". When Gayden was introduced to Clifford Curry, he presented another song he wrote, "She Shot A Hole in My Soul," that started Curry's career with a hit. Gayden produced The Valentines on his song "Gotta Get Yourself Together." All these songs were included on the Grammy-winning album produced by the Country Music Hall of Fame, Night Train to Nashville.

Gayden recorded one album on EMI McGavock Gayden, two on ABC Records, Skyboat, and Hymn to the Seeker. The latter he recorded in Miami at Criteria, with Fleetwood Mac recording Rumours in one studio and the Eagles doing Hotel California in the other. Randy Meisner from the Eagles sang background with Gayden on some songs. One album on Winter Harvest Nirvana Blues was then followed by one album on Arena Records, Come Along (2020).

He was inducted into the Country Music Hall of Fame, Nashville Cats in 2013 with a ceremony at The Country Music Hall of Fame, and was also included in the Dylan/Cash exhibit for over six years and played many concerts for that exhibit. His guitar and wah wah pedal were on exhibit at the Hall of Fame as he innovated the slide wah technique on the JJ Cale song "Crazy Mama". Gayden also published an autobiography, entitled The Missing String Theory − A Musicians Uncommon Spiritual Journey.

== Hits ==
Gayden's biggest hit as a writer is considered to be the song "Everlasting Love", which he co-wrote with Buzz Cason, recorded originally by Robert Knight, a Top 20 hit in the Billboard Hot 100 in 1967. It became a number one hit in the United Kingdom when covered by the Love Affair in January 1968. Also in 1968, a cover by the Australian group Town Criers reached No. 2 in the Australian charts. Carl Carlton's popular soul version was a number six hit in the U.S. in 1974 and has logged over five million plays, according to BMI.

Many artists have recorded the song, including German singer Sandra, who had a hit with it in Germany and all across Europe in 1987, and Gloria Estefan, who reached the top of the Billboard Hot Dance Club Play chart in 1995. U2 recorded the song on the B-side of "All I Want is You", Jamie Cullum had a hit with the song in 2009, and it was used in the films Bridget Jones: The Edge of Reason (two versions were used), America's Sweethearts, Forces of Nature, and Veronica Guerin.

Gayden wrote another hit entitled "She Shot a Hole in My Soul" recorded by Clifford Curry, also covered by the Box Tops. Gayden wrote songs for several black singing groups, Robert Knight (see above), the Valentines, and Clifford Curry. Gayden performed with Bob Dylan, Linda Ronstadt and the Stone Poneys, John Hiatt, Loudon Wainwright, Joe Simon, Ivory Joe Hunter, Margie Hendrix, Kris Kristofferson, Gregg and Duane Allman, Steve Young, Jerry Jeff Walker, Ian & Sylvia, Elvis Presley, Hoyt Axton, Leonard Cohen, and Simon & Garfunkel among others. Gayden wrote country hits for Bobby Bare and Porter Wagoner.

== Guitar work ==
Gayden was also a session guitarist and is renowned for his innovative wah-wah slide guitar technique, as showcased on the early 1970s J. J. Cale hit "Crazy Mama". He also wrote a number of successful songs, including "Hayride", which was a major Australian hit for Flying Circus. "La La" was an even bigger hit. He also co-wrote and co-produced Robert Knight's "Love on a Mountain Top". Simon Cowell recorded Gayden's "Love on a Mountaintop" with Sinitta (Top 20, 1989). When Gayden played on Bob Dylan's album Blonde on Blonde, Dylan's producer Bob Johnston asked to produce an album for him; the album, McGavock Gayden, was released by EMI Records.

== Producing ==
Gayden was latterly producing groups, one of which was his daughter Oceana Gayden, and performed at Bonnaroo and other festivals with her. The other group he was working with is a group called Sweetwater Rose, which he put together and produced and was performing with.

In 2020, Gayden released a new album Come Along on Arena Records, and was recording a family revolutionary album about the times. In his last five years, Gayden tried to help young artists by producing music for them, and helping them write. These included Alexis Saski, Olivia Jones and Bailey Hyneman.

== Death ==
Gayden died in Nashville due to Parkinson's disease on April 16, 2025, at the age of 83.

== Discography ==
- McGavock Gayden (produced by Bob Johnston)
- Skyboat
- Hymn to the Seeker
- Nirvana Blues (CD)
