= Buzz Cason =

American musical artist (1939–2024)

- Also known as: Garry Miles (as singer)
- Born: James Elmore Cason; November 27, 1939; Nashville, Tennessee, U.S.
- Died: June 16, 2024 (aged 84) Franklin, Tennessee, U.S.
- Genres: Pop, C&W
- Occupations: Singer, songwriter, producer
- Years active: 1960s–2024
- Website: buzzcason.com

James Elmore "Buzz" Cason (November 27, 1939 – June 16, 2024) was an American rock singer, songwriter, record producer and author.

== Life and career ==
James Elmore Cason was born in Nashville, Tennessee, on November 27, 1939. He was a founding member of the Casuals, Nashville's first rock and roll band. Together with Richard Williams and Hugh Jarrett of the Jordanaires he recorded as The Statues for Liberty. In 1960, Cason started a solo career under the pseudonym Garry Miles, and had a number 16 hit in 1960 with his cover version of the song "Look for a Star", from the film Circus of Horrors. The "Garry Miles" pseudonym was chosen to resemble the name of Garry Mills, the singer who originally recorded "Look for a Star". Cason then continued to record and issue singles as "Garry Miles" through about 1964, but without much commercial success.

In 1962 he worked as Snuff Garrett's assistant engineer in Los Angeles. During this period, he and Leon Russell, then a session musician, produced The Crickets in a version of the song "La Bamba". The song did well in the United Kingdom and he toured with the group. In Nashville he also worked for arranger Bill Justis.

Around the same time, and under a variety of pseudonyms, Cason also worked as a session vocalist for several Nashville-based budget labels that specialized in issuing knock-off soundalike versions of popular hits. These tracks were recorded quickly and made available for sale at budget prices. All told, Cason sang lead on at least seven of these 'soundalike' singles issued in 1962 and 1963, under such names as "Tommy Fuller", "Fred X. Brown", "Bob Lester", "Bill Allison", "Bill Austin', "Farley Wayne", and "The Shaw Brothers" — both of whom were Cason, double-tracked.

Beginning in 1965, Cason began issuing music under his own name. In 1968 Cason released the single "Adam and Eve" which he both wrote and produced. Despite poor chart performance in his home country, it managed to reach #21 in Australia where it was released by EMI on the "Stateside" label.

Later, he wrote songs together with Bobby Russell, and both ran a publishing and record company until 1974. He also co-wrote several songs and sang backup on Jimmy Buffett's folk-oriented first two albums.

His biggest hit as a writer, with Mac Gayden, was the song "Everlasting Love". Recorded originally by American Robert Knight, the UK’s Love Affair cover version was a number one hit there in January 1968. Carl Carlton's version was a number 6 hit in the US in 1974, and according to BMI has logged over five million plays. In 1968 the Australian band The Town Criers took their version of the song to #2 in that country’s charts. "Everlasting Love" is one of two songs to have entered the Billboard Hot 100 top 40 in the 1960s, 1970s, 1980s, and 1990s and is the only song to have become a UK top 40 hit in the 1960s, 1970s, 1980s, 1990s, and 2000s, reaching the top 20 in every decade except the 1980s.

Cason was also a backing singer for Elvis Presley and Kenny Rogers. From the mid-1980s he had his own rockabilly-styled group, B.C. & the Dartz who released some albums.

As of 2020 Cason was still writing and producing songs.

His book, Living the Rock'N'Roll Dream: The Adventures of Buzz Cason (2004), is about music, freedom, and adventure and sheds light on the events and careers that shaped the early days of rock and roll.

His 1962 song, Soldier of Love (Lay Down Your Arms), co-written with Tony Moon, was covered by the Beatles, Live at the BBC, as well as recorded by Arthur Alexander, Marshall Crenshaw and Pearl Jam.

Cason died in Franklin, Tennessee, on June 16, 2024, at the age of 84.

== Creative Workshop ==
In 1970, Cason founded Creative Workshop, a recording studio for producing acts for Southern Writers Group USA (SWG), Nashville's first writer-owned group of music publishing companies. The first session at the studio was for Jimmy Buffett's second album, High Cumberland Jubilee. In 1982, the studio was expanded via the addition of Creative Workshop II next door. Other artists who would record at the studio included Dolly Parton, Jerry Reed, Merle Haggard, The Judds, The Doobie Brothers, Emmylou Harris, and Olivia Newton-John.
