= Love Affair (band) =

English band

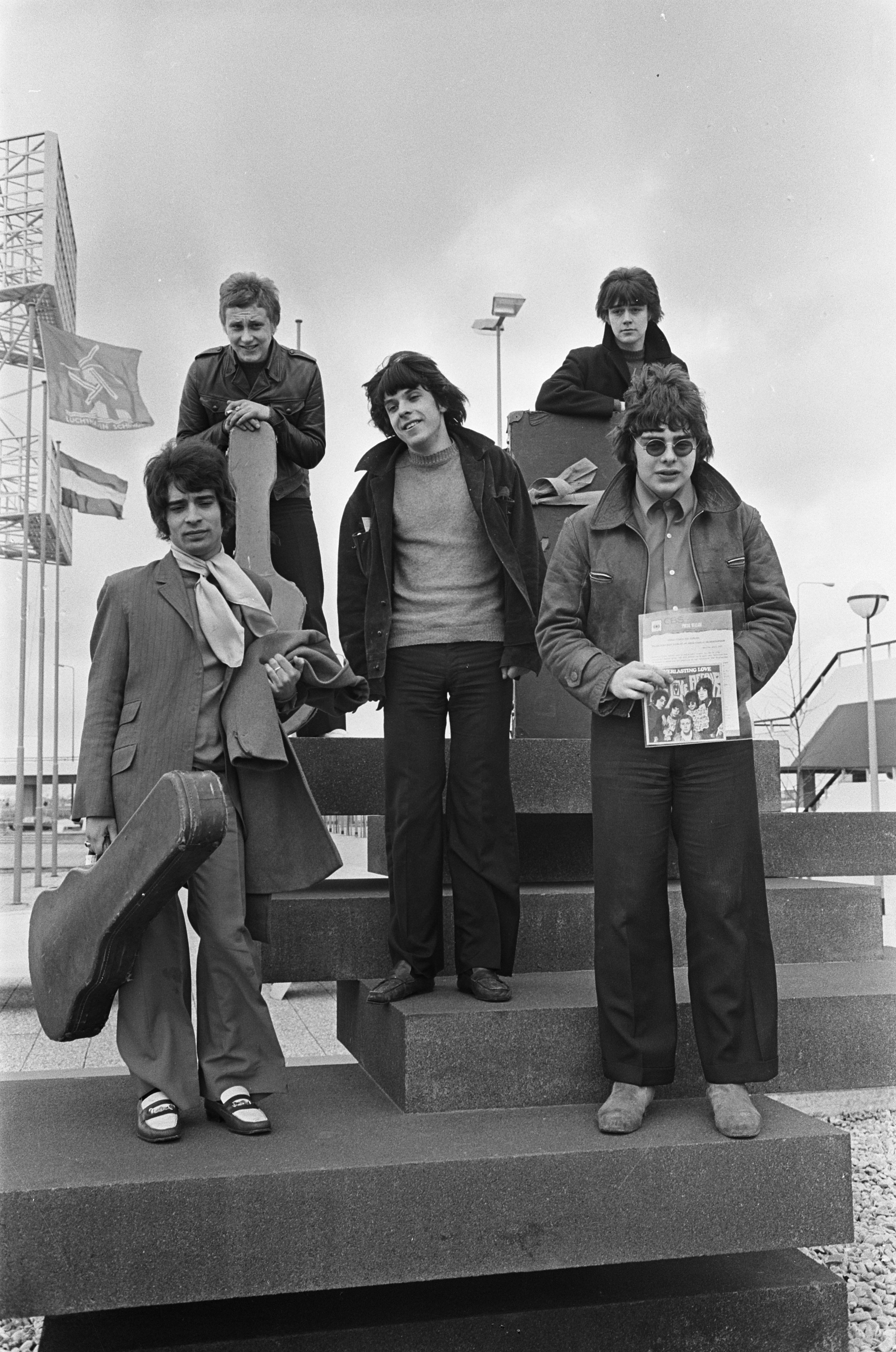
- Love Affair in 1968

Background information
- Origin: London, England
- Genres: Pop; soft rock; progressive rock
- Years active: 1966–1971
- Labels: Decca; CBS
- Past members: Rex Brayley; Maurice Bacon; Mick Jackson; Steve Ellis; Lynton Guest; Morgan Fisher; John Watchman

Love Affair were a London-based pop and progressive rock group formed in 1966. The group had several UK singles chart top 10 hits, including the number one success "Everlasting Love".

== History ==
Love Affair's first single, "She Smiled Sweetly", written by Mick Jagger and Keith Richards and released on Decca Records, flopped, but the band reached the top of the UK Singles Chart in January 1968 with "Everlasting Love". By this time the group had relocated to CBS Records. The song was first recorded by Robert Knight, whose version had reached No. 13 on the Billboard Hot 100 chart in the autumn of 1967, and it was previously offered to Marmalade, who turned it down. On the B-side was a cover version of "Gone Are the Songs of Yesterday", which was written by Phillip Goodhand-Tait. After its success, Goodhand-Tait saw an opportunity and signed a contract with Love Affair's managers John Cokell and Sid Bacon. Goodhand-Tait went on to write more songs for Love Affair.

Lead vocalist Steve Ellis had a similar vocal style to Steve Marriott of the Small Faces, and the production was similar to a Motown soul record. Controversy ensued when the group admitted they had not played on the record, but that all the work was done by session musicians, although such a practice had long since been common. Their first recording of the song, produced by Muff Winwood, had featured them playing all the instruments. But the record label rejected this version in favour of one produced by Mike Smith, recorded with a recording studio rhythm section, strings, brass, flutes and backing vocalists, arranged by Keith Mansfield – and Ellis as the only member of the group to be heard. The backing vocals were provided by four female singers who became well known in their own right: Kiki Dee, Madeline Bell, Lesley Duncan and Kay Garner (as one of the Ladybirds). The bass part was played by Russ Stableford and Clem Cattini played drums.

Four further top 20 hits followed, "Rainbow Valley", "A Day Without Love" (both 1968), "One Road" and "Bringing on Back the Good Times" (both 1969). At the end of that year, they released the album The Everlasting Love Affair.

The group became frustrated at being treated like teen idols, unable to hear themselves on stage because of the constant screaming and at being pigeonholed as a "pop group". All the A-sides featured heavy orchestral and brass arrangements behind Ellis's vocals, with minimal participation from the others, although they wrote and played on the heavier B-sides themselves.

As Ellis wrote in the booklet notes to a later compilation CD, Singles A's and B's, "In an attempt to break the mould we recorded a song far removed from the anthemic-like previous hits." The song was called "Baby I Know". Released at the end of 1969, competing with releases from other big names for a place in the charts over Christmas, it failed completely. Ellis felt the band had run its course and he left in December 1969 for a solo career: "We never really made it big anywhere but Britain and I think that if we had started to happen in America, I wouldn't have left". The group did issue top ten singles in several European countries, as well as New Zealand.

After Ellis' departure, the rest of the band soldiered on without any further success in Britain, continuing briefly with new vocalist, August Eadon (a.k.a. Gus Yeadon). Further releases never charted in Britain, although they did land a No. 14 hit in New Zealand with "Lincoln County". Love Affair recorded a progressive rock album in 1971.

In 1971, they recorded the song "Wake Me I Am Dreaming", an English cover of "Mi ritorni in mente" (music by Lucio Battisti and Italian lyrics by Mogol). By the end of 1974, Love Affair was over.

The group has since been revived, though sometimes without any original members, for cabaret dates; and Ellis has also performed live with a reconstituted Steve Ellis's Love Affair.

Love Affair's first hit song, "Everlasting Love", was used in the film Bridget Jones: The Edge of Reason. However, the CD of the soundtrack contained Jamie Cullum's cover version, instead of the Love Affair version used in the film. Cullum's version is played over the end credits.

In 2021, "Everlasting Love" was featured in the Kenneth Branagh film Belfast. It was also sung in the film by Jamie Dornan.

Ellis died on 30 October 2026, at the age of 76.

== Personnel ==
- Rex Brayley (born Rex Charles Brayley, 3 January 1948, London) – guitar (1967–1971)
- Maurice Bacon (born 26 January 1952, Southgate, London) – drums (1967–1971)
- Mick Jackson (born Michael Jackson, 27 January 1950, Bradford, West Riding of Yorkshire) – bass (1967–1971)
- Steve Ellis (born Stephen John Ellis, 7 April 1950, Edgware, London) – vocals (1967–1970)
- Lynton Guest (born 28 November 1951, Leicester, Leicestershire) – keyboards (1967–1968)
- Morgan Fisher (born Stephen Morgan Fisher, 1 January 1950, Mayfair, London) – keyboards (1968–1971)

== Discography ==
=== Singles ===
Year	Single	Details	Peak chart positions									
Year	Single	Details	UK	AUS	AUT	GER	IRE	NL	NOR	NZ	SA	SWI
1967	"She Smiled Sweetly" b/w "Satisfaction Guaranteed"	Released: 10 February 1967; Label: Decca F12558	—	—	—	—	—	—	—	—	—	—
1967	"Everlasting Love" b/w "Gone Are the Songs of Yesterday"	Released: 8 December 1967; Label: CBS 3125	1	36	12	12	2	12	6	4	9	6
1968	"Rainbow Valley" b/w "Someone Like Me"	Released: 5 April 1968; Label: CBS 3366	5	—	—	37	6	—	—	7	—	—
1968	"A Day Without Love" b/w "I'm Happy"	Released: 30 August 1968; Label: CBS 3674	6	57	17	—	9	—	—	4	15	—
1969	"One Road" b/w "Let Me Know"	Released: 7 February 1969; Label: CBS 3994	16	—	—	—	—	16	—	—	—	—
1969	"Bringing on Back the Good Times" b/w "Another Day"	Released: 4 July 1969; Label: CBS 4300	9	—	—	—	12	—	—	10	—	—
1969	"Baby I Know" b/w "Accept Me for What I Am"	Released: 31 October 1969; Label: CBS 4631	—	—	—	—	—	—	—	—	—	—
1970	"Lincoln County" b/w "Sea of Tranquility"	Released: 6 February 1970; Label: CBS 4780	—	—	—	—	—	—	—	14	—	—
1970	"Speak of Peace, Sing of Joy" b/w "Brings My Whole World Tumbling Down"	Released: 29 May 1970; Label: CBS 5017	—	—	—	—	—	—	—	—	—	—
1971	"Wake Me I Am Dreaming" (with Gus Eadon) b/w "That's My Home"	Released: 19 February 1971; Label: Parlophone R5887	—	—	—	—	—	—	—	—	—	—
1971	"Help (Get Me Some Help" (featuring Gus Eadon) b/w "Long Way Home"	Released: 10 September 1971; Label: Parlophone R5918	—	—	—	—	—	—	—	—	—	—
1973	"Let Me Dance" b/w "Love's Looking Out at You"	Released: 16 February 1973; Label: Pye 7N. 45218	—	—	—	—	—	—	—	—	—	—
1977	"Private Lives" b/w "Let a Little Love Come In"	Released: 28 October 1977; Label: Creole CR 146	—	—	—	—	—	—	—	—	—	—
1987	"Witch Queen of New Orleans" b/w "Witch Queen of New Orleans" (The Get Down and Stay Down Mix)	Released: April 1987; Label: Hit the Deck Cruise 1T	—	—	—	—	—	—	—	—	—	—
1988	"Witch Queen of New Orleans" b/w "Stumbled on Love"	Released: January 1988; Label: Hit the Deck Cruise 1	—	—	—	—	—	—	—	—	—	—
"—" denotes releases that did not chart or were not released

=== Albums ===
- CBS 63416 (December 1968) The Everlasting Love Affair
- CBS 64109 (1970) New Day – credited to "LA"

=== Compilation CDs ===
- Columbia 469202 2 (1991) Everlasting Hits – 16 tracks recorded by the band in 1968/1969. Released under Sony's "Memory Pop Shop" label.
- Columbia 504419 2 (2001) The Best of the Good Times – includes three new previously unreleased tracks by Ellis
- ACA 8031 (2002) Singles A's and B's – includes six tracks recorded by Ellis as a solo artist (1970–71)
