= David Scott-Morgan =

Dave Morgan
- Born: David Raymond Morgan; 19 August 1942 (age 83); Bordesley, Birmingham, England
- Genres: Pop, rock
- Occupations: Musician, songwriter
- Instruments: Guitar, bass, vocals, keyboards
- Label: FM Revolver
- Member of: The Orchestra
- Formerly of: Electric Light Orchestra, Magnum, The Uglys, Balls, Tandy Morgan Band

David Scott-Morgan (born David Raymond Morgan on 19 August 1942) is an English songwriter and musician.

== Career ==
Morgan was a member of The Uglys with Steve Gibbons between 1967 and 1969, where he was the bassist and vocalist. Morgan was part of the spin-off Balls with Gibbons and Trevor Burton, until he was replaced by Denny Laine.

Morgan was subsequently bassist and vocalist with Magnum, departing before their debut album, and was guitarist with E.L.O. from 1981 to 1986. He is credited with performing background vocals on the 1983 E.L.O. album Secret Messages and Jeff Lynne's Armchair Theatre.

Morgan formed the Tandy-Morgan Band with E.L.O keyboardist Richard Tandy in 1985. Together they recorded the concept album Earthrise. The album contained 14 tracks, all written by Morgan, with Tandy's keyboard arrangements. Earthrise was produced with Steve Lipson, and eventually released on vinyl in 1986 on the FM Revolver label. In 1992, Morgan released the album on CD. In 2011 a revised and updated version, titled EARTHRISE Special Edition, was released on the Rock Legacy label.

When interviewed by the editorial board of the E.L.O. fan club, Tandy and Morgan were asked if they had "any music that's never been released". They revealed that they did and in 1987 released B.C. Collection, songs recorded by Morgan, Tandy and bass player Martin Smith between 1985 and 1987. The album contained the original version of the song "Hiroshima", which was a hit in Germany in 1978 for the band Wishful Thinking. In 1990, the German singer Sandra's version was a No. 4 hit, again in Germany.

Other songs written by Morgan were "Something", written for The Move, and released as a B-side to their 1968 No. 1 hit "Blackberry Way"; and "This Time Tomorrow", also written for The Move, and released as a B-side to their 1969 hit "Curly".

Morgan also recorded an album in 1970 that was issued on the now defunct US Ampex label as Morgan and later in Germany on the Global label. It was not released in the UK and has not been reissued. After 1987, Morgan continued releasing solo albums, on his privately owned label, some of which are inspired by his Christian faith.

== Personal life ==
Morgan married Mandy Scott in April 1997 and is now known as David Scott-Morgan. He is also a qualified pilot and part-time flight instructor at Wellesbourne Mountford Aerodrome near Stratford-upon-Avon.

== Discography ==
=== Solo albums ===
- Morgan (1971) – as Dave Morgan - US only release initially
- Call (1997) – David Scott-Morgan - Dave Morgan Music
- Long Way Home (1999) – David Scott-Morgan - Scottmorgan Music
- Reel 2 (2001) – - as Dave Morgan - Scottmorgan Music
- Angel Light (2001) – David Scott-Morgan - Scottmorgan Music
- Across the Divide (2012) (as Morgan) – Grimm Doo Records
- Bubbles (2017) – (as Morganisation) – promotional copy only
- Highland E.P. (2018) – (as Morganisation) – Grimm Doo Records
- Seven (2019) (as Morganisation) – Grimm Doo Records
- Bubbles 2 (2019) – (as Morganisation) – Grimm Doo Records
- Made in Britain (2020) – (as Morganisation) – Grimm Doo Records
- Signz (2022) – (as Morganisation) – Grimm Doo Records
- Morgan 50 - (2021) – (as Morganisation) – Grimm Doo Records

=== Collaborations ===
- Earthrise Special Edition (2011) - (as Morgan Tandy)
- B.C. Collection (2015) 3rd Edition - (as Tandy Morgan Smith) - All Morgan songs except Tandy's Enola Sad
- The Secret Album (2022) – (as Morgan Cleary) – Grimm Doo Records

=== Compositions on Compilations and by Other Artists ===
2021	Separate Paths Together: An Anthology of British Male Singer/Songwriters 1965-1975 Composer, Primary Artist
2021	Once Upon a Time in the West Midlands: The Bostin' Sounds of Brumrock 1966-1974 Composer, Primary Artist
2020	Peephole in My Brain: British Progressive Pop Sounds of 1971 Composer
2018	Try a Little Sunshine: The British Psychedelic Sounds of 1969 Composer
2016	The Very Best of Sandra Sandra Composer
2012	Mixed-Up Minds, Pt. 2: 1969-1973 Primary Artist
2006	One with Everything Styx Conductor
2002	Just the Right Sound: The Association Anthology The Association Group Member
2000	Flashback Electric Light Orchestra Musician
1998	Spirit: A History Magnum Vocals, Bass
1990	Armchair Theatre Jeff Lynne Choir/Chorus, Guest Artist, Vocals (Background)
1983	Secret Messages Electric Light Orchestra Vocals, Vocals (Background)
1971	Hiroshima Wishful Thinking Composer
	Folklore: An Anglo Saxon Tribe of Acoustic Troubadours Recorded Between 1965-1973 Primary Artist
