= Robert Knight (singer) =

American singer (1940–2017)

- Robert Knight in 1967

Background information
- Born: Robert Henry Peebles; April 21, 1940; Franklin, Tennessee, U.S.
- Died: November 5, 2017 (aged 77) Nashville, Tennessee, U.S.
- Genres: Soul, pop
- Occupations: Singer
- Years active: 1960–2017
- Labels: Dot, Monument

Robert Knight (born Robert Henry Peebles; April 21, 1940 – November 5, 2017) was an American singer, best known for his 1967 recording of the song "Everlasting Love".

== Career ==
Robert Peebles was born in Franklin, Tennessee, United States, in 1940 according to family and official records, though some sources give the year 1945. As Robert Knight, he made his professional vocal debut with the Paramounts, a quintet consisting of school friends. Signed to Dot Records in 1960, they recorded "Free Me" in 1961, a US R&B hit single that outsold a rival version by Johnny Preston.

After this initial success, their subsequent releases flopped, resulting in a breakup of the group. They also broke their recording contract with Dot and were prevented from recording for 4 1/2 years. Knight attended Tennessee State University, where he studied chemistry and sang with the Fairlanes, a vocal trio.

In 1967, after Knight was seen performing with the Fairlanes in Nashville at a Vanderbilt University fraternity, he was offered a contract as a solo artist by the Rising Sons label. His first recording, "Everlasting Love", written by label owners Buzz Cason and Mac Gayden, was a success, reaching number 14 on the US R&B chart and number 13 on the Hot 100 on 18–25 November 1967. This enduring song was an even bigger success in the UK the following year when a version by Love Affair reached number 1, preventing Knight's version from progressing further than number 40.

Knight scored two further pop hits at home, "Blessed Are the Lonely" and "Isn't It Lonely Together". In the 1970s he hit the UK Singles Chart again with the re-issue of his 1968 recording "Love on a Mountain Top", reaching number 10 in early 1974 in the UK Singles Chart. The song was also written by Cason and Gayden. The re-issued "Everlasting Love" went even higher in the UK in 1974, reaching the Top 20, and Carl Carlton's version peaked at number 6 on the Hot 100 on 23–30 November 1974, seven years to the week after Knight's version peaked. His final UK chart record was "Better Get Ready for Love" which reached number 53 in May 1974.

He also worked for Vanderbilt University as a chemical lab technician, a chemistry teacher, and a member of the grounds crew.

Knight died at home in Nashville, Tennessee, aged 77.

== Discography ==
=== Studio albums ===
| Year | Album | US Pop |
|---|---|---|
| 1967 | Everlasting Love | 196 |
| 1971 | Love on a Mountain Top (UK only) | — |
"—" denotes releases that did not chart.

=== Singles ===
| Year | Single | Chart positions | | | |
| Year | Single | US Pop | US R&B | UK | CAN |
|---|---|---|---|---|---|
| 1967 | "Everlasting Love" | 13 | 14 | 40 | 26 |
| 1968 | "Blessed Are the Lonely" | 97 | — | — | — |
| 1968 | "Isn't It Lonely Together" | 97 | — | — | 85 |
| 1970 | "I Only Have Eyes for You" | — | — | — | — |
| 1973 | "Love on a Mountain Top" | — | — | 10 | — |
| 1974 | "Everlasting Love" (reissue) | — | — | 19 | — |
| 1974 | "Better Get Ready for Love" | — | — | 53 (Note: Chart position is from the official UK "Breakers List".) | — |
| 1974 | "The Outsider" | — | — | — | — |
| 1975 | "I'm Coming Home to You" | — | — | — | — |
| 1976 | "I've Got News for You" | — | — | — | — |
"—" denotes releases that did not chart or were not released in that territory.

== See also ==
- Monument Records
- List of 1960s one-hit wonders in the United States
