= The M.E.T.A.L. Fest =

Live album by Freedom Call
- Released: 14 July 2023
- Recorded: 2022
- Venues: Pilsen and Regensburg, Germany
- Genre: Power metal
- Length: 76:43
- Label: Steamhammer
- Producers: Chris Bay, Lars Rettkowitz

Freedom Call chronology
M.E.T.A.L. (2019)	The M.E.T.A.L. Fest (2023)	Silver Romance (2024)

Singles from The M.E.T.A.L. Fest
- 1. "The M.E.T.A.L. Fest" Released: 3 June 2023

Professional ratings
Review scores
Source	Rating
Dead Rhetoric	8/10
Earshot.at	7.5/10
Metal Temple	6/10
Obliveon	8.5/10
Science of Noise	7.75/10

The M.E.T.A.L. Fest is the third live full-length album by the German power metal band Freedom Call. It was released on 14 July 2023, by SPV. The title track is a studio track recorded exclusively for this album, with a music video released on the same day as the album.

== Track listing ==
No.	Title	Original album	Length
1.	"The M.E.T.A.L. Fest" (studio track)		3:55
2.	"Intro"		1:23
3.	"Union of the Strong"	Beyond	5:07
4.	"Tears of Babylon"	Legend of the Shadowking	4:05
5.	"Spirit of Daedalus"	M.E.T.A.L.	5:15
6.	"Sail Away"	M.E.T.A.L.	4:29
7.	"Metal Invasion"	Eternity	7:10
8.	"M.E.T.A.L."	M.E.T.A.L.	4:22
9.	"111 - The Number of Angels"	M.E.T.A.L.	3:53
10.	"The Ace of the Unicorn"	M.E.T.A.L.	3:24
11.	"Freedom Call"	Crystal Empire	7:12
12.	"Power and Glory"	Land of the Crimson Dawn	3:59
13.	"Metal Is for Everyone"	Master of Light	5:34
14.	"Warriors"	Eternity	4:51
15.	"Far Away"	Dimensions	3:32
16.	"Land of Light"	Eternity	5:41
17.	"Outro"		0:51
Total length:			76:43

== Personnel ==
- Chris Bay – vocals, guitar
- Lars Rettkowitz – guitar, backing vocals
- Francesco Ferraro – bass, backing vocals
- Chris Widmann – drums
