= Cédric "Cede" Dupont =

- Born: 22 March 1979 (age 47); Switzerland
- Genres: Metal, hard rock, rock, blues
- Years active: 1999–present

Cédric "Cede" Dupont (born 22 March 1979) is a Swiss musician, mainly known for his activities in Freedom Call and Symphorce

== Biography ==
Cédric "Cede" Dupont is mainly known as a former guitarist for German metal acts Freedom Call, Symphorce and Downspirit. Currently he plays guitar in Silent Circus, a modern metal band from Switzerland. Also he is mainly focused on Pontillo & The Vintage Crew, solo band of singer Gianni Pontillo from Nazareth.He started playing music by the age of 12 when he got his first guitar.

In 1999, he joined German band Symphorce with whom he released seven albums through Noise Records, Metal Blade Records and AFM Records up to 2010, and has been touring Europe with bands such as Kamelot, Grave Digger and Sonata Arctica, as well as playing music festivals such as Wacken Open Air, Earthshaker Fest, Summer Breeze Open Air and ProgPower USA.

From 2001 to 2005, he has also been playing in Freedom Call (label: SPV) where he recorded two studio albums and one live album. After playing several extensive tours across Europe in all his active years in Freedom Call he decided to leave the band in late 2005 to concentrate on new projects. He has been working on some instrumentals that were released in 2010 in form of his first solo album, Melodrama.

In 2009, Dupont formed Downspirit, who released their debut album in mid-2010 followed by touring in Europe with acts such as Grave Digger, Sinner, Good Charlotte & Axel Rudi Pell. In July 2012, Downspirit's second album called Bulletproof has been released. Prior to its release the band has been touring with Adrenaline Mob and finished their 2012 tour including shows with Doro.

In August 2013, Dupont joined Swiss modern metal band Silent Circus, his current main priority. Their recent album "Rise and Fall" was released 27/01/2017 through Universal Music. Their first single/video "Inner Voice" off of the new album aired on 09/12/2016. Currently the band is touring across Europe. They last European Tour announced was with Swiss folk metal band Eluveitie that lead them to Germany, Denmark, Norway, Sweden, Finland, Estonia, Latvia, Lithuania and Poland in December 2017. In August 2019, Silent Circus was announced as special guest to Bullet for my Valentine in Switzerland.

2023 marks his entry to join Pontillo & the Vintage Crew where his main focus lies at the moment. A new album is expected to be released in 2027.

== Discography ==
With Symphorce

- Sinctuary (2000)
- Phorceful Ahead (2002)
- Twice Second (2004)
- Godspeed (2005)
- Become Death (2007)
- Unrestricted (2010)

With Freedom Call

- Eternity (2002)
- Live Invasion (2004)
- The Circle of Life (2005)
- Ages of Light (2013)

With Downspirit

- Point of Origin (2010)
- Bulletproof (2012)

As a solo artist

- Melodrama (2010)
- Lullaby (2019)

With Silent Circus

- Rise and Fall (2017)
