= Ages of Light =

Ages of Light (1998–2013)

Compilation album by Freedom Call
- Released: 26 April 2013
- Recorded: CD 2: 26 January – 2 February 2013
- Studios: Separate Sound Studio and FC Studio in Nürnberg
- Genre: Power metal
- Length: CD 1: 78:37; CD 2: 23:51
- Label: SPV
- Producers: Chris Bay & Stephan Ernst

Freedom Call chronology
Land of the Crimson Dawn (2012)	Ages of Light (1998–2013) (2013)	Beyond (2014)

Professional ratings
Review scores
Source	Rating
Imperiumi	8-/10
Metal.de	Favourable
Powermetal.de	Favourable
Rock Hard	
Time For Metal	9.5/10 stars

Ages of Light (1998–2013) is the first best-of compilation by German power metal band Freedom Call. It was released on 26 April 2013 via SPV.

== Track listing ==
=== Ages of Light (CD 1) ===
No.	Title	Length
1.	"We Are One" (From Stairway to Fairyland)	4:57
2.	"Tears Falling" (From Stairway to Fairyland)	5:39
3.	"Freedom Call" (From Crystal Empire)	5:19
4.	"Farewell" (From Crystal Empire)	3:49
5.	"Metal Invasion (Live)" (From Live Invasion)	7:01
6.	"Warriors" (From Eternity)	4:19
7.	"Land Of Light" (From Eternity)	3:34
8.	"Hunting High And Low" (From The Circle Of Life)	4:01
9.	"Mr. Evil" (From Dimensions)	3:43
10.	"Far Away" (From Dimensions)	3:18
11.	"Blackened Sun" (From Dimensions)	4:38
12.	"Thunder God" (From Legend of the Shadowking)	3:30
13.	"Tears Of Babylon" (From Legend of the Shadowking)	3:38
14.	"A Perfect Day (Live)" (From Live in Hellvetia)	3:58
15.	"Hero On Video" (From Land of the Crimson Dawn)	3:42
16.	"Power And Glory" (From Land of the Crimson Dawn)	3:24
17.	"Rockstars" (From Land of the Crimson Dawn)	4:58
18.	"Back into The Land Of Light" (From Land of the Crimson Dawn)	5:09
Total length:		78:37

=== Masqueraded (CD 2) ===
No.	Title	Length
1.	"Rockin' Radio" (Killerbilly Version)	4:11
2.	"Metal Invasion" (Metal Folk Version)	4:16
3.	"Mr. Evil" (Melodic Reggae Version)	3:48
4.	"Hero On Video" (Speed Ska Version)	3:35
5.	"Age of the Phoenix" (Power Swing Version)	3:38
6.	"Freedom Call" (Campfire Strumming Version)	4:23
Total length:		23:51

== Personnel ==
- Chris Bay (1998–present) – vocals, guitar, keyboards – all tracks
- Sascha Gerstner (1998–2001) – guitar – Ages of Light (disc 1): tracks 1–4
- Cédric Dupont (2001–2005) – guitar – Ages of Light (disc 1): tracks 5–8
- Lars Rettkowitz (2005–present) – guitar – Ages of Light (disc 1): tracks 9–18 / Masqueraded (disc 2): all tracks
- Ilker Ersin (1998–2005) – bass guitar – Ages of Light (disc 1): tracks 1–8
- Armin Donderer (2005–2009) – bass guitar – Ages of Light (disc 1): tracks 9–11
- Samy Saemann (2009–2013) – bass guitar – Ages of Light (disc 1): tracks 12–18 / Masqueraded (disc 2): all tracks
- Daniel Zimmermann (1998–2010) – drums – Ages of Light (disc 1): tracks 1–13
- Klaus Sperling (2010–2013) – drums – Ages of Light (disc 1): tracks 14–18 / Masqueraded (disc 2): all tracks
