= Unrestricted =

Unrestricted may refer to:

- Unrestricted (Da Brat album)
- Unrestricted (Symphorce album)
- Unrestricted carry, a situation within a jurisdiction in which the carrying of firearms is not restricted in any way by the law
