= Live in Hellvetia =

Live album / DVD by Freedom Call
- Released: 20 May 2011
- Recorded: 29 December 2010
- Venues: Z7 Pratteln, Switzerland
- Genre: Power metal
- Length: DVD: 115:37; CD 1: 48:55; CD 2: 53:47
- Label: SPV
- Producer: Chris Bay

Freedom Call chronology
Legend of the Shadowking (2010)	Live in Hellvetia (2011)	Land of the Crimson Dawn (2012)

Professional ratings
Review scores
Source	Rating
Metal Hammer Germany	5/7 stars
Imperiumi	5-/10
Metal.de	9/10
Metalitalia.com	6/10
Powermetal.de	9/10
Scream Magazine	Average

Live in Hellvetia is the first live DVD by the German power metal band Freedom Call. It was released on 20 May 2011 by SPV. The album was recorded on 29 December 2010 in Z7 Pratteln, Switzerland—known as Helvetia.

== Track list ==
All tracks are written by Chris Bay and Dan Zimmermann except where noted.

DVD 1: Live @ Z7 Pratteln/Switzerland
No.	Title	Length
1.	"We Are One"	5:20
2.	"United Alliance"	6:17
3.	"Thunder God"	4:35
4.	"Tears Of Babylon"	4:08
5.	"Blackened Sun"	4:50
6.	"Queen Of My World"	5:25
7.	"Out Of The Ruins" (Rettkowitz)	4:58
8.	"Hunting High And Low" (Bay, Zimmermann, Dupont)	4:08
9.	"Drum Solo" (background music "Overture 1812" by P. Tschaikowsky)	3:59
10.	"Metal Invasion"	8:05
11.	"Merlin - Requiem"	3:28
12.	"Merlin - Legend Of The Past"	4:59
13.	"The Quest"	9:19
14.	"Warriors"	4:38
15.	"A Perfect Day"	6:29
16.	"Far Away"	4:42
17.	"Mr. Evil"	7:50
18.	"Land Of Light"	5:06
19.	"Freedom Call"	7:45
20.	"Hymn To The Brave"	8:56
Total length:		115:37

DVD 2: A Perfect Day in the life of Freedom Call
No.	Title	Length
1.	"Interviews"	19:57
2.	"Ein Tag im Leben von Freedom Call"	29:54
3.	"Tourimpressionen und vieles mehr"	40:00
Total length:		89:51

CD 1
No.	Title	Length
1.	"We Are One"	5:21
2.	"United Alliance"	5:35
3.	"Thunder God"	3:59
4.	"Tears Of Babylon"	4:11
5.	"Blackened Sun"	4:49
6.	"Queen Of My World"	5:00
7.	"Out Of The Ruins" (Rettkowitz)	4:36
8.	"Hunting High And Low" (Bay, Zimmermann, Dupont)	4:07
9.	"Drum Solo" (background music "Overture 1812" by Tchaikovsky)	3:42
10.	"Metal Invasion"	7:35
Total length:		48:55

CD 2
No.	Title	Length
1.	"Merlin - Requiem"	3:02
2.	"Merlin - Legend Of The Past"	4:32
3.	"The Quest"	8:15
4.	"Warriors"	4:56
5.	"A Perfect Day"	3:57
6.	"Far Away"	4:09
7.	"Mr. Evil"	4:52
8.	"Land Of Light"	4:10
9.	"Freedom Call"	7:44
10.	"Hymn To The Brave"	8:10
Total length:		53:47
