= Hunting High and Low (disambiguation) =

Hunting High and Low is the debut studio album by a-ha.

Hunting High and Low may also refer to:

- "Hunting High and Low" (song), 1986
- "Hunting High and Low", a song by Stratovarius from Infinite, 2000
- "Hunting High and Low", a song by Freedom Call from The Circle of Life, 2005
