= Live Invasion =

Live album by Freedom Call
- Released: 10 May 2004
- Recorded: CD 1: April–May 2002; CD 2: September 1999
- Venues: CD 1: Düsseldorf, Munich and Stuttgart
- Studios: CD 2: Karo Studios in Brackel and CCC Studios in Bräuningshof
- Genre: Power metal
- Length: CD 1: 66:52; CD 2: 33:55
- Label: SPV
- Producers: Charlie Bauerfeind, Chris Bay, Dan Zimmermann

Freedom Call chronology
| Eternity (2002) | Live Invasion (2004) | The Circle of Life (2005) |

Professional ratings
Review scores
| Source | Rating |
|---|---|
| AllMusic | 2.5/5 stars |
| Heavymetal.dk | 8/10 |
| Metalitalia.com | 6/10 |
| Metal Storm | 8.5/10 |
| Metal Temple | 8/10 |
| Metal.de | 6/10 |
| Powermetal.de | Favourable |
| Rock Hard | |
| Soundi | 2/5 stars |

Live Invasion is the first live album by the German power metal band Freedom Call. It was released on 10 May 2004, by SPV. The album was recorded in Düsseldorf, Munich, and Stuttgart during the band's "Eternal World Tour 2002".

On the second disc, the extended "story version" of "Tears of Taragon" features Biff Byford as narrator.

== Track listing ==
=== CD 1 ===
All tracks are written by Chris Bay and Dan Zimmermann.

| No. | Title | Length |
|---|---|---|
| 1. | "The Spell" | 0:59 |
| 2. | "We Are One" | 4:41 |
| 3. | "Freedom Call" | 4:55 |
| 4. | "Tears Of Taragon" | 5:43 |
| 5. | "The Quest" | 8:30 |
| 6. | "Heart Of The Rainbow" | 5:29 |
| 7. | "The Eyes Of The World" | 4:23 |
| 8. | "Metal Invasion" | 7:10 |
| 9. | "Land Of Light" | 4:06 |
| 10. | "Warriors" | 4:43 |
| 11. | "Shine On" | 6:40 |
| 12. | "Rise Up" | 4:17 |
| 13. | "Hymn To The Brave" | 5:16 |
| Total length: | | 66:52 |

=== CD 2 ===
Re-release of the Taragon EP, previously available only in France and Japan.

All tracks are written by Chris Bay and Dan Zimmermann except where noted.

| No. | Title | Length |
|---|---|---|
| 1. | "Warriors Of Light" | 4:10 |
| 2. | "Dancing With Tears In My Eyes" (Ultravox Cover) | 3:53 |
| 3. | "Heart Of The Brave" | 5:17 |
| 4. | "Kingdom Come" (EP Version) | 4:48 |
| 5. | "Tears of Taragon" (Story Version) | 9:50 |
| 6. | "Hiroshima" (Wishful Thinking Cover) | 4:09 |
| 7. | "Dr. Stein" (Helloween Cover) | 4:48 |
| Total length: | | 33:55 |

== Personnel ==
- Chris Bay – vocals, guitar, keyboards
- Cédric Dupont – guitar
- Ilker Ersin – bass guitar
- Nils Neumann – keyboards
- Dan Zimmermann – drums
