= Beyond (Freedom Call album) =

Studio album by Freedom Call
- Released: February 21, 2014
- Recorded: September 9 – November 22, 2013
- Studios: Separate Sound Studio and FC Studio in Nürnberg
- Genre: Power metal
- Length: 59:09
- Label: Steamhammer
- Producers: Chris Bay & Stephan Ernst

Freedom Call chronology
Ages Of Light (2013)	Beyond (2014)	Master of Light (2016)

Beyond is the eighth full-length album by the German power metal band Freedom Call. It was released on February 21, 2014, by SPV. A vinyl version of Beyond was released on March 14, 2014.

Beyond marked the return of founding member, bassist Ilker Ersin, and the addition of Ramy Ali on drums.

== Critical reception ==
In a review for Metal Injection, Shayne Mathis wrote: "...Freedom Call have consistently released album after album of fun, hyper-melodic power metal that's only gotten better with time, and Beyond may be the band's best album yet. These Germans may not be the most creative or adventurous power metal band out there, but they're definitely one of the most enjoyable. Unless you're a total sourpuss, it's impossible to listen to this album without feeling the urge to smile (or battle a dragon while soaring on the wings of an eagle)." He continued: "Despite the mammoth running time and rote formula the songs lapse into occasionally, Beyond is still an entertaining record for fans of triumphant metal. This is an album best experienced blasting through car speakers with the windows rolled down on the way to meet your friends for beers and good times."

In a 7.5/10 review for Hardrockhaven.net, Justin Gaines wrote: "Freedom Call – a.k.a. the happiest power metal band in the universe – are back with a new studio offering... ...titled Beyond. The long-running German band took a risk with their last album – 2012’s Land of the Crimson Dawn – where they mixed in quirky, Edguy-style rock songs with their usual shiny, happy, power metal. It wasn’t terribly well received, so the band is back on (very) familiar territory with Beyond. If you have at least one older Freedom Call album, you probably know what to expect from Beyond. The band basically takes the Helloween formula and makes it even faster and more melodic. Between Chris Bay’s melodic guitar work and his high-pitched vocals, it’s hard to sit still when a Freedom Call album is playing. Beyond takes the band back to the familiar lyrical territory of warriors, enchanted lands and unity in metal. Yes, it’s cheesy and yes, it’s a little weird to hear battle hymns sung in such a high octave, but it’s so damned hard to resist when these guys get going."

Similar scores to that of Hardrockhaven include 6.5 from Rock Hard, 7 from Metal.de and Metalitalia.com, and 7.5 from Powermetal.de whereas very strong ratings include a 9 minus from Imperiumi, and weaker scores include a 4 out of 7 from Metal Hammer Germany.

== Track listing ==
All tracks are written by Chris Bay except where noted.

No.	Title	Length
1.	"Union Of The Strong"	5:02
2.	"Knights Of Taragon"	4:43
3.	"Heart Of A Warrior" (Rettkowitz)	3:12
4.	"Come On Home"	4:03
5.	"Beyond" (Bay, Ali)	7:48
6.	"Among The Shadows"	3:44
7.	"Edge Of The Ocean" (Rettkowitz)	3:36
8.	"Journey Into Wonderland"	3:58
9.	"Rhythm Of Light"	4:02
10.	"Dance Off The Devil"	3:45
11.	"Paladin" (Bay, Rettkowitz)	4:07
12.	"Follow Your Heart" (Bay, Ersin)	3:51
13.	"Colours Of Freedom"	4:15
14.	"Beyond Eternity"	3:03
Total length:		59:09

Limited Edition bonus CD
No.	Title	Length
1.	"Back Into The Land Of Light" (Live In The Black Forest)	5:42
2.	"Hero On Video" (Live In The Black Forest)	3:55
3.	"Rockstars" (Live In The Black Forest)	5:02
4.	"Farewell" (Live In The Black Forest)	5:24
5.	"Mr. Evil (Reggae Vs. Metal)" (Live In The Black Forest)	5:12
6.	"Power & Glory" (Live In The Black Forest)	3:32
7.	"Freedom Call" (unplugged)	5:39
8.	"The Quest" (unplugged)	8:25
9.	"Warriors" (unplugged)	4:29
10.	"Power & Glory" (unplugged)	3:41
11.	"Farewell" (unplugged)	4:51
12.	"Mr. Evil (Reggae)" (masqueraded live)	4:16
13.	"Rockin' Radio (Killerbilly)" (masqueraded live)	4:27
Total length:		64:35

== Personnel ==
- Chris Bay – vocals, guitar
- Lars Rettkowitz – rhythm guitar
- Ilker Ersin – bass guitar
- Ramy Ali – drums

== Charts ==
- Czech Republic #38 (Album charts)
- Germany #33 (Media Market/Saturn Charts)
- Germany #41 (Album charts)
- Sweden #15 (Hard rock charts)
- Sweden #99 (Album charts)
- Switzerland #74
