= M.E.T.A.L. =

Studio album by Freedom Call
- Released: 23 August 2019
- Studios: Little Sun Creek Lounge Studio; Separate Sound Studios
- Genre: Power metal
- Length: 43:33
- Label: Steamhammer
- Producers: Chris Bay, Lars Rettkowitz

Freedom Call chronology
| Master of Light (2016) | M.E.T.A.L. (2019) | Silver Romance (2024) |

Singles from M.E.T.A.L.
- 1. "111 - The Number of the Angels" Released: 22 June 2019; 2. "M.E.T.A.L." Released: 19 July 2019; 3. "Spirit of Daedalus" Released: 16 August 2019

Professional ratings
Review scores
| Source | Rating |
|---|---|
| Metal Hammer Germany | 4.5/7 |
| Metal.de | 6/10 |
| Metalitalia.com | 7/10 |
| Powermetal.de | 8/10 |
| Rock Hard | 7/10 |

M.E.T.A.L. is the tenth full-length album by the German power metal band Freedom Call. It was released on 23 August 2019, by SPV. Singles were released for some songs including "111 - The Number of the Angels" and "Spirit of Daedalus". The band promoted the album with their "20th Anniversary – METAL" tour through Germany on September and October with Visions of Atlantis as special guests, along with four shows in Italy with Dragonhammer and Raven's Gate.

== Track listing ==
| No. | Title | Length |
|---|---|---|
| 1. | "111 - The Number of the Angels" | 3:52 |
| 2. | "Spirit of Daedalus" | 3:49 |
| 3. | "M.E.T.A.L." | 4:20 |
| 4. | "The Ace of the Unicorn" | 3:22 |
| 5. | "Sail Away" | 4:02 |
| 6. | "Fly with Us" | 4:17 |
| 7. | "One Step into Wonderland" | 3:39 |
| 8. | "Days of Glory" | 3:29 |
| 9. | "Wheel of Time" | 4:32 |
| 10. | "Ronin" | 3:47 |
| 11. | "Sole Survivor" | 4:24 |
| Total length: | | 43:33 |

Japanese edition bonus tracks
| No. | Title | Length |
|---|---|---|
| 12. | "Warriors" (acoustic version) | 4:17 |
| 13. | "Emerald Skies" (acoustic version) | 4:10 |
| Total length: | | 52:00 |

== Personnel ==
- Chris Bay – vocals, guitar
- Lars Rettkowitz – guitar
- Francesco Ferraro – bass
- Kevin Kott – drums (all tracks except 3 and 5)
- Dan Zimmermann – drums (tracks 3 and 5)
