= Freedom Call =

German power metal band

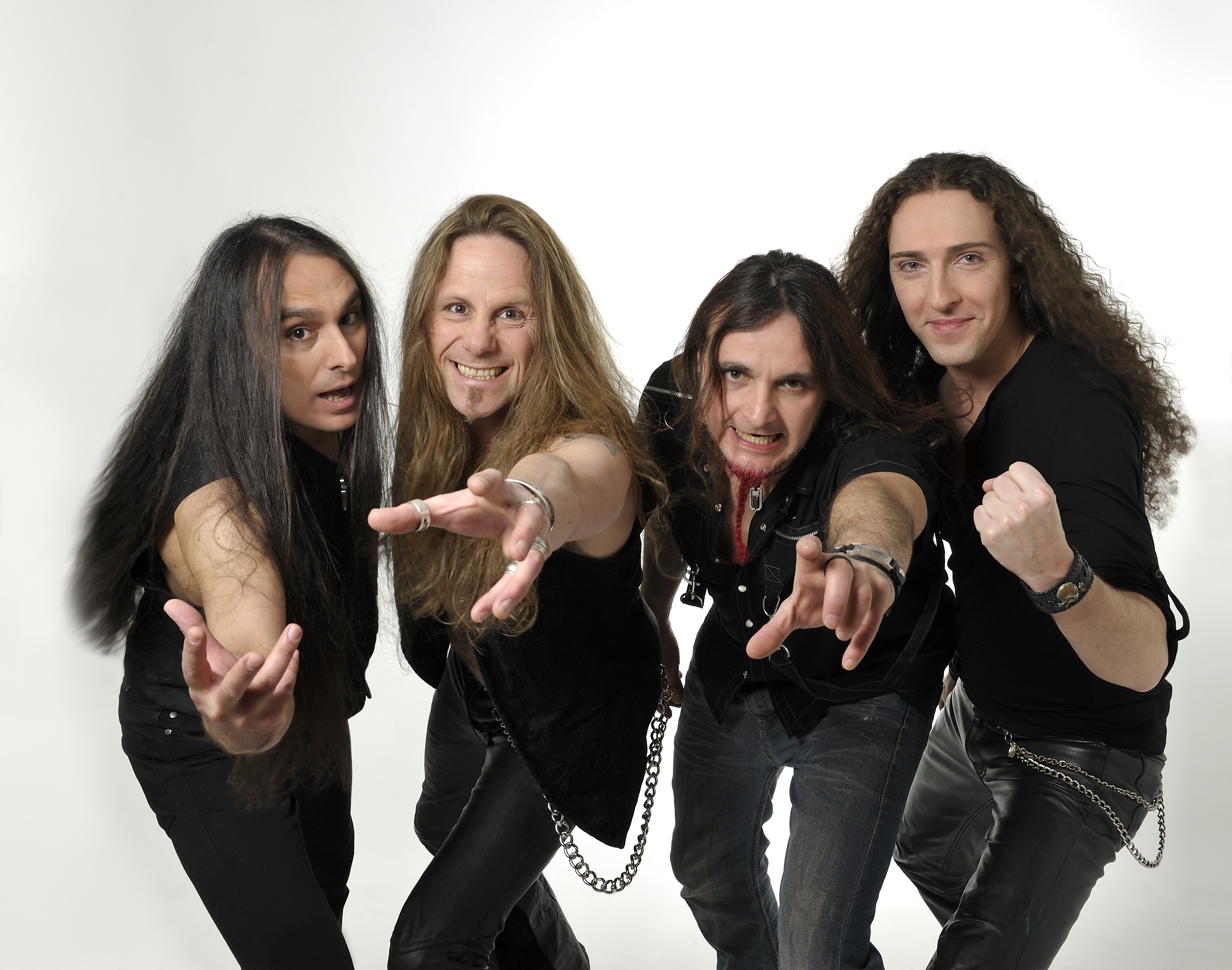
- Freedom Call (2013)

Background information
- Origin: Nuremberg, Germany
- Genre: Power metal
- Years active: 1998–present
- Label: SPV/Steamhammer
- Members: Chris Bay; Lars Rettkowitz; Francesco Ferraro; Ramy Ali
- Past members: Dan Zimmermann; Sascha Gerstner; Cédric "Cede" Dupont; Nils Neumann; Armin Donderer; Samy Saemann; Klaus Sperling; Ilker Ersin
- Website: freedom-call.net

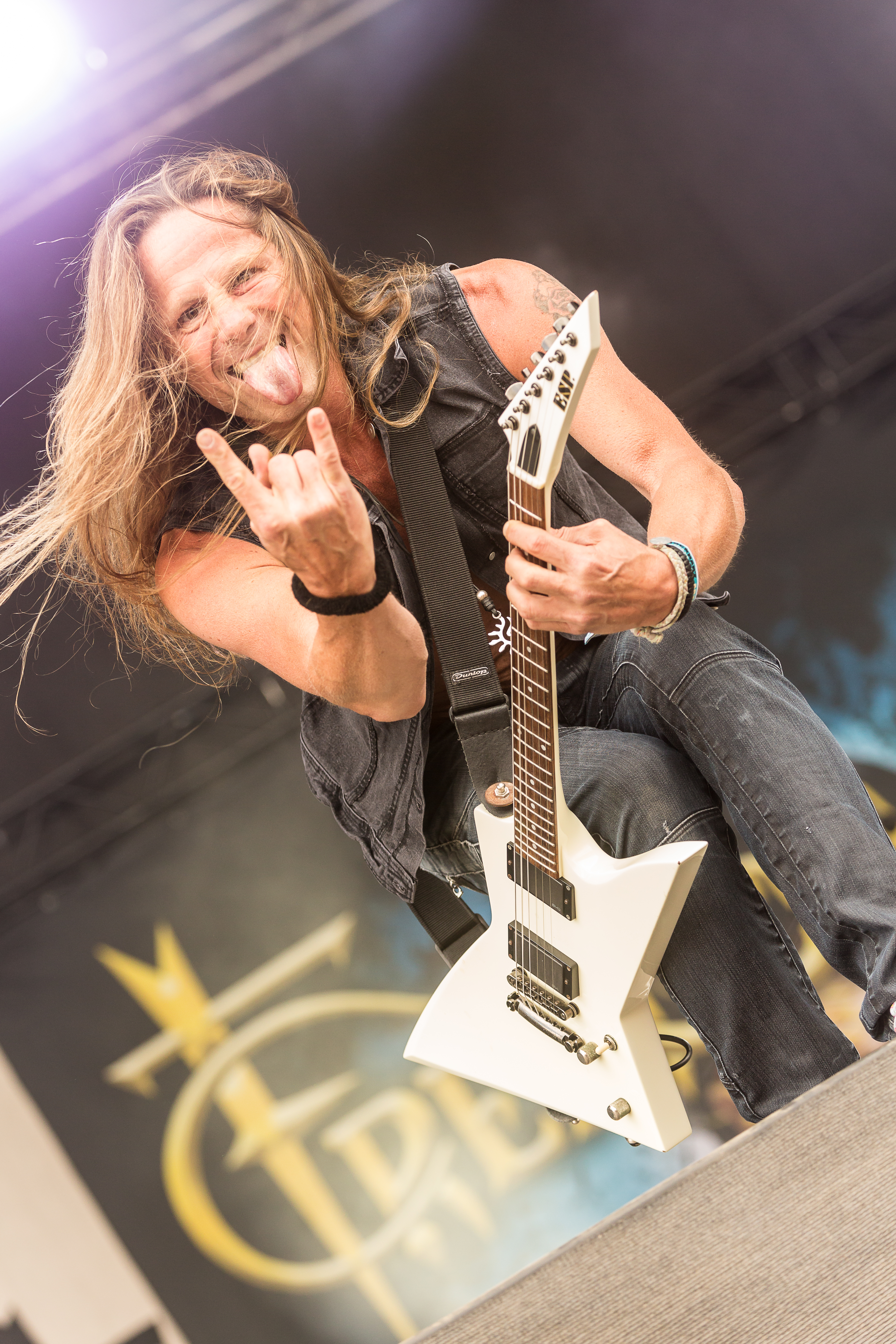
Singer Chris Bay at Rockharz Open Air 2019

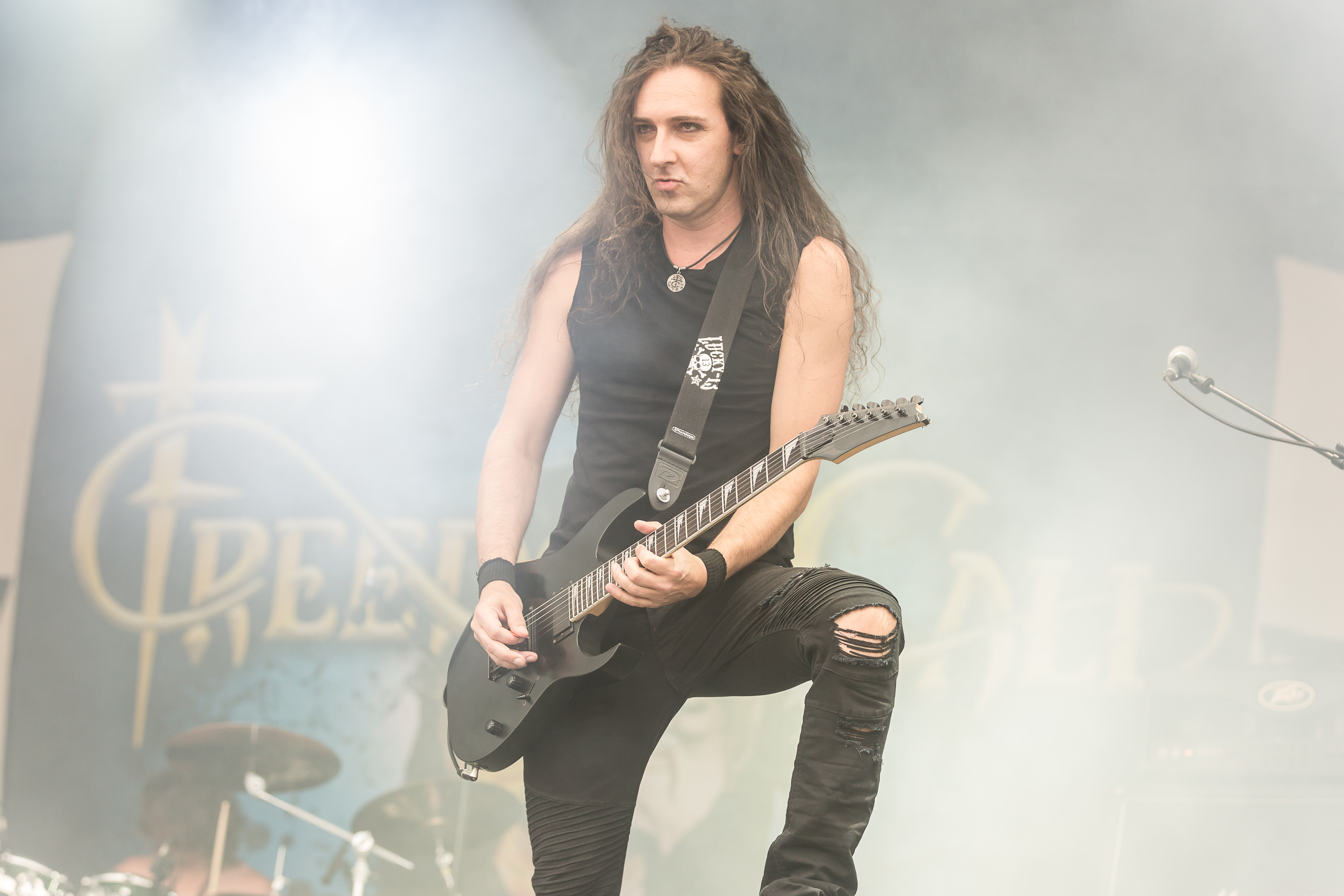
Guitarist Lars Rettkowitz at Rockharz Open Air 2019

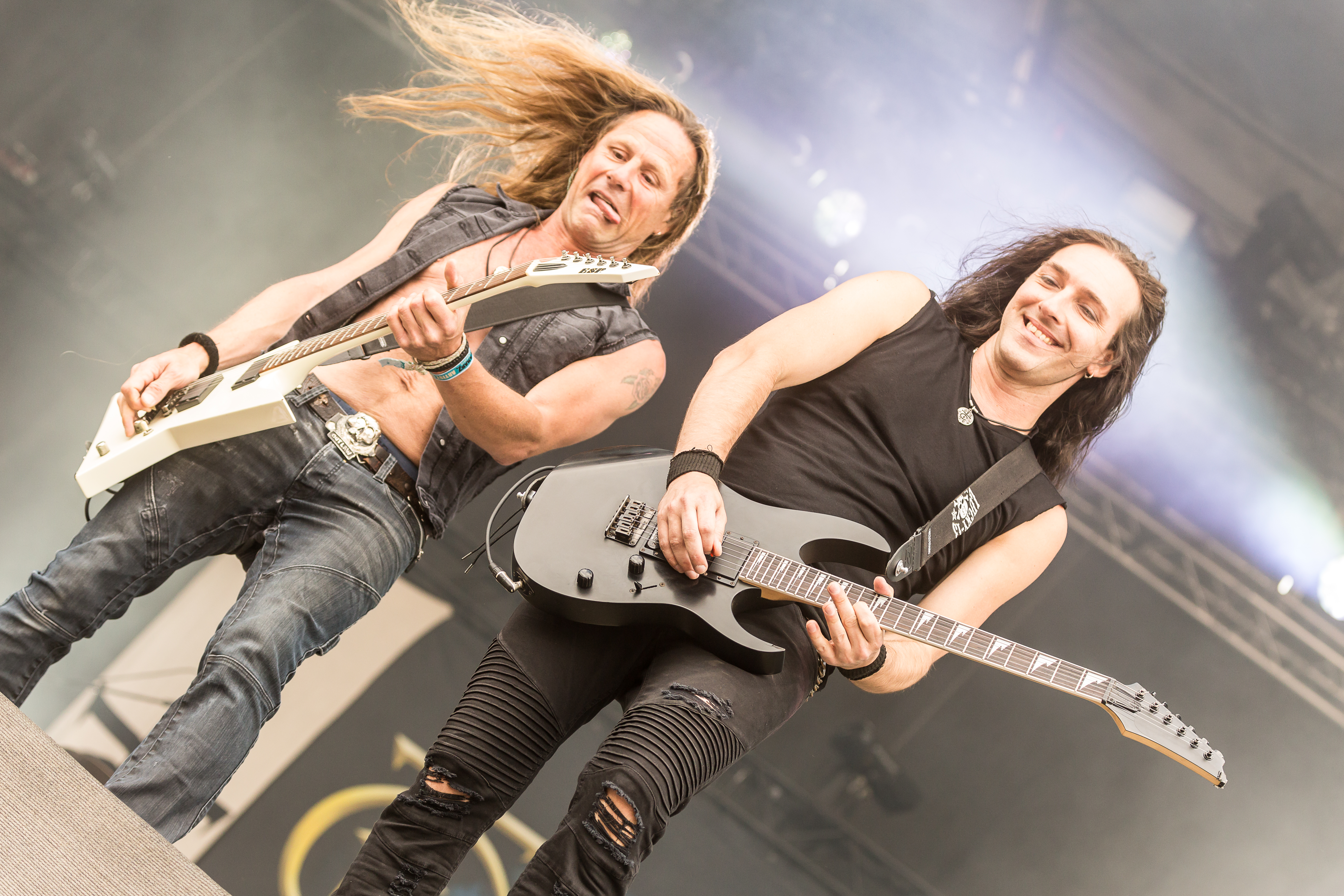
Singer Chris Bay and Guitarist Lars Rettkowitz at Rockharz Open Air 2019

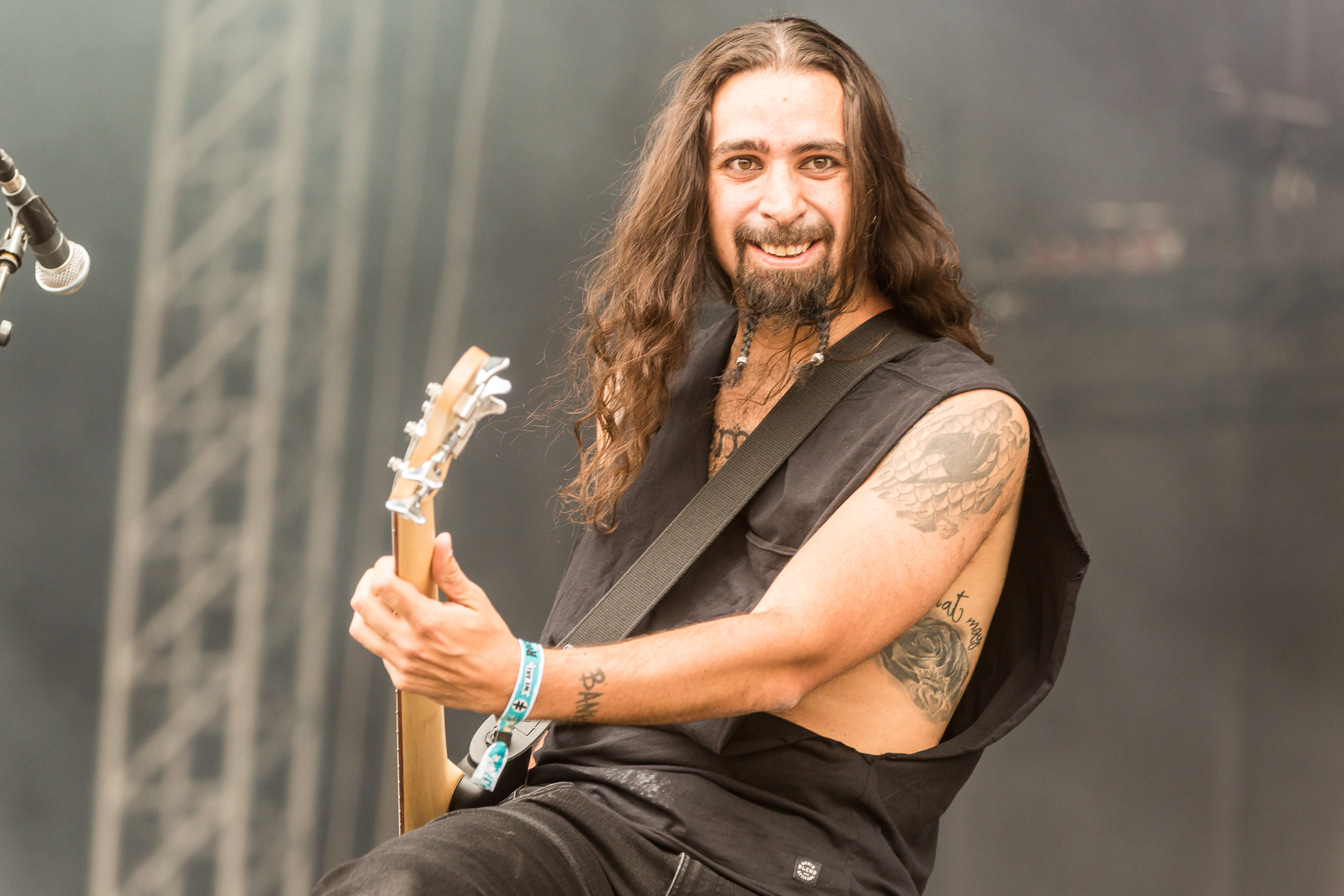
Bassist Francesco Ferraro at Rockharz Open Air 2019

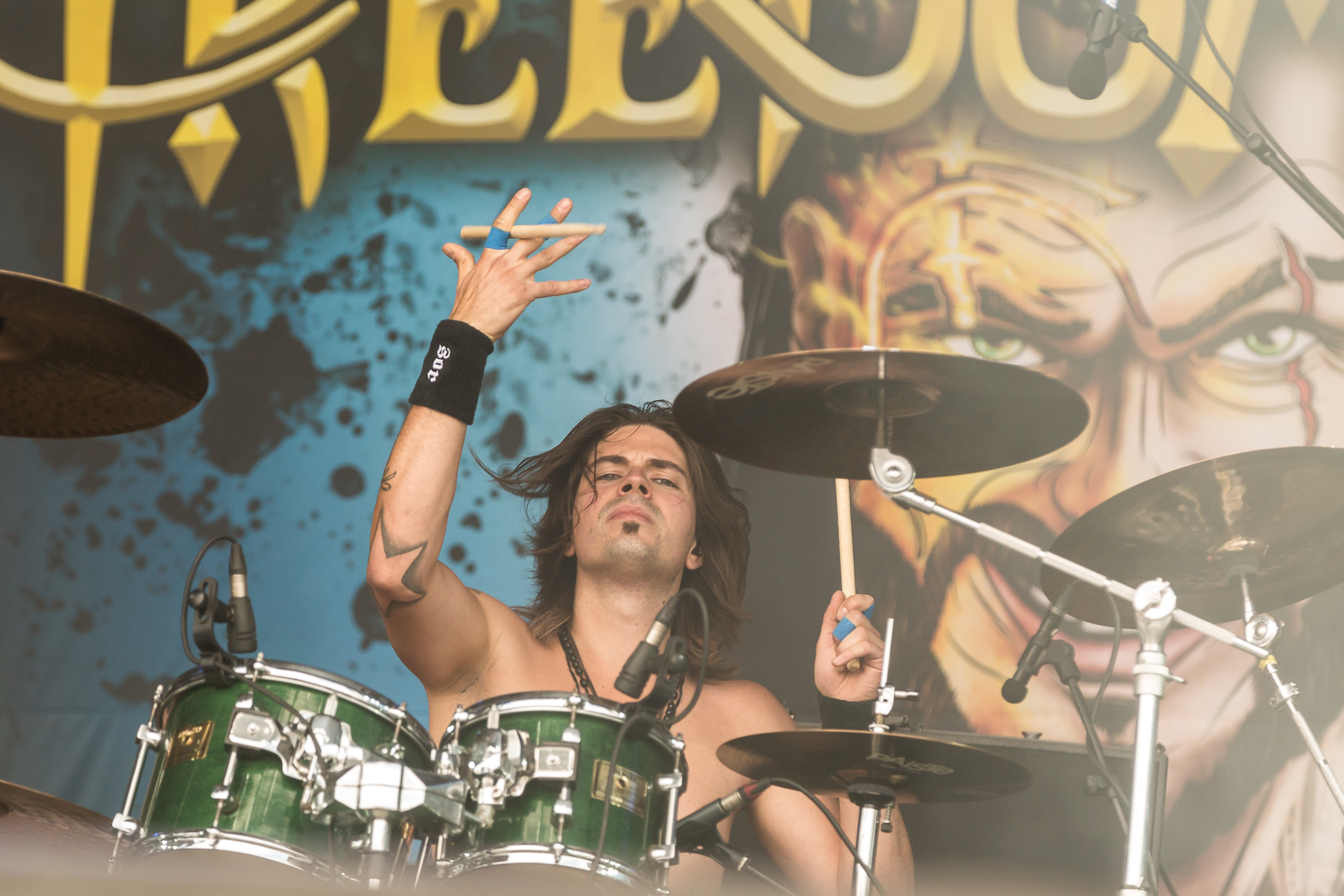
Drummer Timmi Breideband at Rockharz Open Air 2019

Freedom Call is a German power metal band formed in 1998. The band tours regularly and the current line-up includes one original member, lead vocalist and songwriter, Chris Bay. Freedom Call has released 14 albums in total, eleven of these being studio albums.

== Biography ==
=== Background ===
Freedom Call's frontman Chris Bay gained a lot of his vocal ability from his grandfather, an opera singer with the Berlin State Opera, and his mother, who was a sought-after chorus singer. When only seven he began to play the guitar and by the time he was ten had tried his hand at the piano.

Having played in various local rock bands, Bay moved to Hamburg in 1990 and got his first serious gig when he worked with Zed Yago. From 1993 to 1996 Chris was a member of former Victory guitarist Hermann Frank's band Moon Doc, with whom he recorded the albums "Moon Doc" (1995) and "Get Mooned" (1996).

=== Founding (1997–1998) ===
In 1998 Chris Bay and old friend Daniel Zimmermann formed Freedom Call during an off-period for the latter's main band, Gamma Ray with the stated goal of making "Happy Metal". The two had started writing songs together towards the end of 1997. They eventually completed a six-song demo Freedom Call with well-known producer Charlie Bauerfeind, who offered the tape to several record companies.

At the same time, the Freedom Call line up was completed by Ilker Ersin on bass guitar and Sascha Gerstner on guitar. In 1998 Chris and Dan had seen Sascha playing in a cover band.

=== Stairway to Fairyland and Crystal Empire (1999–2001) ===
Freedom Call's debut album, Stairway to Fairyland was released on 7 May 1999 by NTS Records. Stairway to Fairyland would sell over 35,000 copies in the first year of its release. On 25 May 1999 Freedom Call made their live debut with a tour of France as support band for Angra and Edguy. At the end of August, Freedom Call commenced recording of the five-track mini LP Taragon. Taragon featured new songs, a cover version of Ultravox's "Dancing With Tears in My Eyes", a new version of "Stairway to Fairyland", a new version of "Tears of Taragon" with Biff Byford, singer with Saxon narrating the "Tale of Taragon" on it. There was also a bonus track for Japan called "Kingdom Come".

By the end of 1999, Freedom Call had entered the studio again to record their second album Crystal Empire, this released on 22 January 2001. Crystal Empire was promoted as the logical musical continuation of Stairway To Fairyland.

In March 2001 Sascha Gerstner left Freedom Call (he would later join Helloween). Gerstner was eventually replaced by Cédric "Cede" Dupont, the Swiss guitarist of Symphorce.

=== Eternity and The Circle of Life (2002–2006) ===
In the middle of January 2002 the new lineup began recording a new album called Eternity. Dan and Chris produced Eternity on their own this time as Charlie Bauerfeind was not available. He was, however, responsible for the drum recordings and the final mix. Eternity was released on 3 June 2002 by Steamhammer.

Later that year, Freedom Call was invited on tour with Blind Guardian. During this tour they recorded the live album, Live Invasion together with Charlie Bauerfeind in Düsseldorf, Stuttgart and Munich. Live Invasion was released on 10 May 2004 by SPV.

The keyboard player on this tour, Nils Neumann, was soon invited to become the fifth member of the band. After an extended break, the next album The Circle of Life was recorded at Hansen Studio, Hamburg and FC Studios, Nuremberg from August to October 2004. The Circle of Life was released on 21 May 2005 by SPV.

Shortly after the release of The Circle of Life, both Cédric "Cede" Dupont and Ilker Ersin decided to leave Freedom Call (independently of each other). Replacements were eventually announced in the form of newcomer guitarist Lars Rettkowitz and Armin Donderer, formerly of Paradox.

=== Dimensions (2007–2008) ===
A new album with the title Dimensions was released on 20 April 2007. Commenting on Dimensions, Daniel Zimmerman said: "Even if the two predecessors, Eternity and The Circle of Life, took very different directions, both albums had a number of strong moments. Dimensions combines the most successful elements from both albums, in other words: we included our penchant for fast and very melodic numbers from Eternity with the more contemporary, bombastic components of The Circle of Life."

The songs "The Wanderer" and "Dimensions" were also used in the online rhythm game "Flash Flash Revolution".

=== Legend of the Shadowking and Land of the Crimson Dawn (2009–2012) ===
In March 2009, the band announced that they were putting the finishing touches to a new album, Legend of the Shadowking, and that they had parted ways with bassist Armin Donderer, who would be replaced by Samy Saemann. Legend of the Shadowking was released on 29 January 2010 by SPV.

For the 2010 touring cycle, Dan Zimmerman announced that he would be replaced by Klaus Sperling as during this time he [Zimmerman] would be on the road with Gamma Ray. It was later confirmed on the band's website that Zimmermann had officially left the band.

Live in Hellvetia was the first live DVD by Freedom Call. It was released on 20 May 2011 by SPV. Live in Hellvetia was recorded on 29 December 2010 in Z7 Pratteln, Switzerland.

The title of the next Freedom Call studio album, Land of the Crimson Dawn, was announced in September 2011. Chris Bay had previously announced that the band was working on the album and it would be released sometime in February 2012. Land of the Crimson Dawn was released 24 February 2012 by SPV.

=== Beyond and Master of Light (2013–present) ===
Ages of Light (1998–2013) is the first best-of compilation by Freedom Call. It was released on 26 April 2013 by SPV.

The band announced on 15 September 2013 that they were working on a new album, Beyond, with a new lineup. Ilker Ersin returned to the band to resume bass duties and Ramy Ali joined the band on drums.

A music video was filmed on 15 December 2013 for the song Union of the Strong. The shoot took place in the vicinity of Nuremberg and Franconia, the song was taken from the album Beyond that was released on 21 February 2014. A vinyl version of Beyond was released on 14 March 2014. Beyond was produced by Chris Bay and Stephan Ernst at the Separate Sound Studios in Nuremberg and at Freedom Call's own studio.

In May 2015 Freedom Call released 666 Weeks Beyond Eternity, a reissued edition of their 2002 studio album, Eternity. As the title suggests, 666 Weeks Beyond Eternity was released 666 weeks after the release of the original album. The re-issue is a two disc set featuring the original Eternity album which has been remastered, plus it includes some bonus content on the second disc including live tracks, acoustic tracks, special versions of their songs, as well as a new song written exclusively for this release. In support of the album release, the 666 Weeks Beyond Eternity Tour 2015 occurred between October 2015 (Glasgow, UK; 9 Oct) and December 2015 (Augsburg, Germany; 22 Dec).

In July 2016 Freedom Call launched a new Official Fanclub on Facebook.

Freedom Call's ninth studio album, Master of Light was released on 11 November 2016 (18 November in USA). The first single taken from the album (Hammer of the Gods) was released on 8 July 2016. A promotional video for the track Metal is for Everyone became available on 2 November 2016. Following a release party at Rockcafe Brown Sugar in Nürnberg on 10 November 2016, the four-city Master of Light Latin America tour ran from 25 November until 2 December 2016.

The Master of Light tour which began in 2016 continued through 2017 and in to 2018. Countries visited as part of the 2017–2018 legs of the tour included Argentina, Austria, Belgium, Brazil, Colombia, the Czech Republic, France, Germany, Hungary, Italy, Japan, Mexico, Netherlands, Portugal, Slovakia, Spain, Sweden, Switzerland, Thailand and the UK. A number of festival dates also took place, with others scheduled for 2018 that included 70,000 Tons of Metal from 1 to 5 February 2018, and include Metalfest Open Air 2018 and Leyendas Del Rock 2018. The band's 2024 full-length album was called Silver Romance and released in May by Steamhammer.

=== Chris Bay solo ===
In November 2017 Chris Bay announced that he would be releasing his first solo album, Chasing The Sun, on Steamhammer/SPV records on 23 February 2018. The first single from the album "Radio Starlight" was released on 1 December 2017. Of the album and its content Bay commented: "I permanently write songs and am constantly working on ideas in the studio... ...that's why I've collected a whole lot of tracks over the years that on the one hand don't really suit Freedom Call and on the other are just too good to gather dust in my archive." The second single from the album (Hollywood Dancer) was released on 2 February 2018.

== Members ==
- Chris Bay – lead vocals, guitar, keyboards (1998–present)
- Lars Rettkowitz – guitar (2005–present)
- Francesco Ferraro – bass (2019–present)
- Ramy Ali – drums (2013–2018, 2023–present)

Live members

- Klaus Sperling – drums (2010–2013, 2020–present)

Former members

- Sascha Gerstner – guitar (1998–2001)
- Cédric "Cede" Dupont – guitar (2001–2005)
- Ilker Ersin – bass (1998–2005, 2013–2018)
- Armin Donderer – bass (2005–2009)
- Samy Saemann – bass (2009–2013)
- Dan Zimmermann – drums (1998–2010)
- Timmi Breideband – drums (2019)
- Nils Neumann – keyboards (2004–2005)
- Rolf Köhler - choir vocals (1998-2001: seasons musician)

== Discography ==
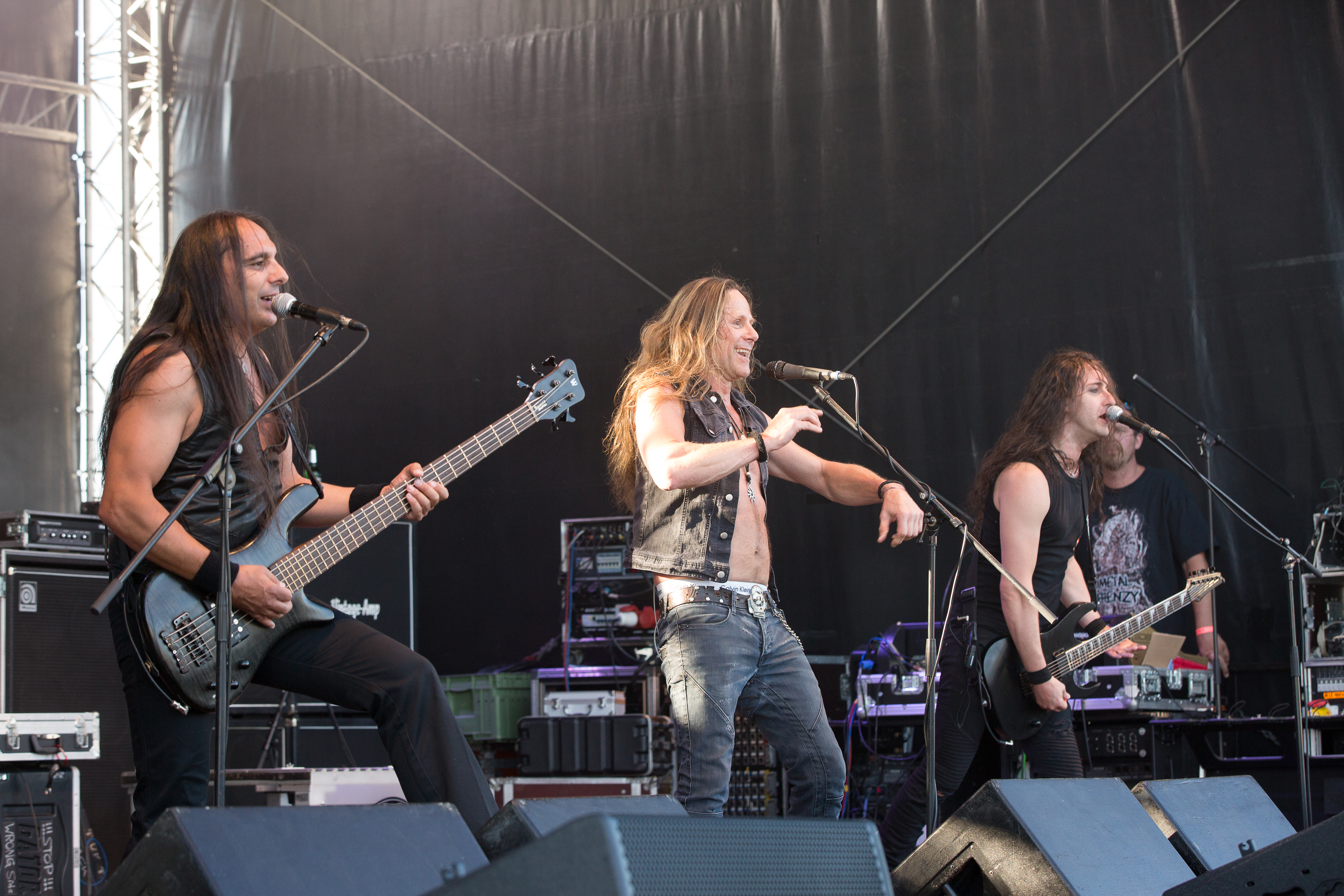
Freedom Call at Metal Frenzy 2018

=== Studio albums ===
- Stairway to Fairyland (1999)
- Crystal Empire (2001)
- Eternity (2002)
- The Circle of Life (2005)
- Dimensions (2007)
- Legend of the Shadowking (2010)
- Land of the Crimson Dawn (2012)
- Beyond (2014)
- Master of Light (2016)
- M.E.T.A.L. (2019)
- Silver Romance (2024)

=== Live albums ===
- Live Invasion (2004)
- Live in Hellvetia (2011)
- The M.E.T.A.L. Fest (2023)

=== Special releases ===
- Ages of Light (Compilation) (2013)
- 666 Weeks Beyond Eternity (Eternity re-release and remastered with bonus material) (2015)

=== Demo ===
- Freedom Call demo (1998)

=== EPs/Singles ===
- Taragon (1999)
- Silent Empire (Acoustic EP) (2001)
- "Eternity" (2002)
- "Blackened Sun" (2007)
- "Mr. Evil / Innocent World" (2007)
- "Zauber der Nacht" (2010)
- "Rockin' Radio" (2012)
- "Power & Glory" (2012)
- "Union of the Strong" (2014)
- "Hammer of the Gods" (2016)
- "111 – the Number of the Angels" (2019)
- "The M.E.T.A.L. Fest" (2023)
- "Silver Romance" (2024)
- "In Quest of Love" (2024)
- "High Above" (2024)
- "Heavy Metal Happycore" (2026)
