= Symphorce =

German metal band

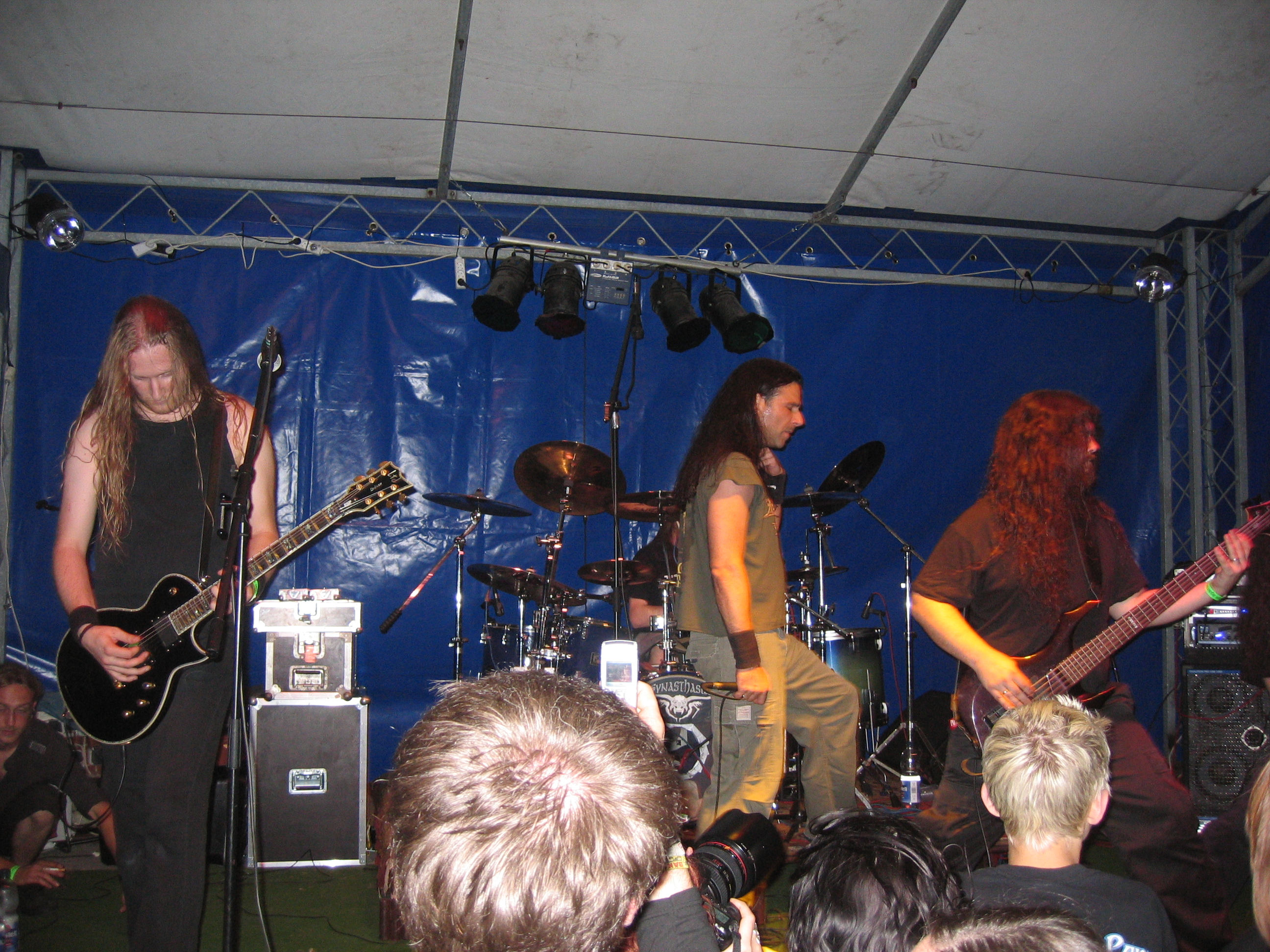
- Symphorce in 2007

Background information
- Origin: Stuttgart, Germany
- Genres: Power metal, heavy metal
- Years active: 1998–2011
- Labels: AFM, Metal Blade, Noise

Symphorce was a German progressive power metal band, originally assembled in 1998.

== History ==
The band was formed in October 1998 by singer Andy B. Franck. He created the name Symphorce as a play of words, a portmanteau of symphony and force. It was a few months later, in 1999 that they released their first album Truth to Promises on Noise Records. The release had them touring as support act for Mercyful Fate. After this first tour, a big step happened in the history of the band, when Andy had to replace two band members. It was the arrival of guitarist Cédric "Cede" Dupont and bassist Dennis Wohlbold, that gave the band an entire new sound.

A year later, in 2000, their combined songwriting resulted in the second album Sinctuary. Andy began to combine Symphorce with singing in the band Brainstorm at the same time.

Two years later, Cédric "Cede" Dupont joined the band Freedom Call on top of his part in Symphorce, and two new members have given the band a complete new energy. Sasha Sauer on drums and Markus Pohl on second guitars give the others more breathing space, and in 2002 the new album Phorceful Ahead was released, now on Metal Blade, their new label.

In 2005, the guitarist Markus Pohl joined Mystic Prophecy as a full-time member, after previously just been a touring member.

Drummer Sascha Sauer left in 2005 after a tour of Europe and the United States. On 2 September 2006, it was announced that his replacement was Steffen Theurer.

In 2009, Symphorce began work on a new album. Cédric "Cede" Dupont had an interview on Dave Softee's Meltdown on Metal Messiah Radio on 17 February 2009 informing about new plans for Symphorce and his new formed band Downspirit.

The band released their latest album, Unrestricted, on 15 October 2010 via AFM Records.

On 10 October 2011, vocalist Andy B. Franck announced that Symphorce had disbanded.

Current activities by Symphorce members are: Brainstorm/Almanac (Andy B. Franck), Silent Circus (Cédric "Cede" Dupont), Mystic Prophecy/Powerwolf (Markus Pohl), Ruby Shock (Dennis Wohlbold) and Souldrinker (Steffen Theurer).

== Band members ==
Last line-up

- Andy B. Franck – vocals
- Cédric "Cede" Dupont – guitars
- Markus Pohl – guitars
- Dennis Wohlbold – bass
- Steffen Theurer – drums

Former members

- Sascha Sauer – drums (2001–2005)
- Stefan Koellner – drums (1999–2000)
- H.P. Walter – keyboards (1998–2002)
- Mike Hammer – bass (1999)
- Stefan Bertolla – guitar (1999)

== Discography ==
- Truth to Promises (1999)
- Sinctuary (2000)
- Phorceful Ahead (2002)
- Twice Second (2004)
- Godspeed (2005)
- Become Death (2007)
- Unrestricted (2010)
