= Truth to Promises =

Studio album by Symphorce
- Released: 1999
- Recorded: Maryland Studios, Merklingen, Germany; September–November 1998
- Genres: Heavy metal, power metal
- Length: 49:51
- Label: Noise
- Producers: Andy B. Franck, H. Peter Walter, Rüdiger Gerndt and Jörg Umbreit

Symphorce chronology
Truth to Promises (1999)	Sinctuary (2001)

Professional ratings
Review scores
Source	Rating
Rock Hard	8.5/10

Truth to Promises is the debut album by Heavy/Power metal band Symphorce.

== Track listing ==
1. "Truth to Promises" – 4:32
2. "Drifted" – 4:57
3. "Wounded" – 4:18
4. "Retracing the Line" – 3:34
5. "Stronghold" – 3:57
6. "Across the Plains" – 4:27
7. "Forevermore" – 5:15
8. "Pouring Rain" – 4:18
9. "Circles Are Broken" – 6:37
10. "Sea of Life" – 7:56
11. "Yap over Bamis" (bonus track) – 4:01

"Sea of Life" ends at 4:50, followed by two minutes of silence and a hidden track.

== Credits ==
=== Band members ===
- Andy B. Franck – lead & back up vocals
- Stef Bertolla – guitar
- H. Peter Walter – keyboards
- Mike Hammer – bass
- Stefan Köllner – drums

=== Production ===
- Rüdiger Gerndt, Jörg Umbreit – co-producers, engineers, mixing
- Dennis Ward – drums recording and mixing
