= Twice Second =

Studio album by Symphorce
- Released: January 12, 2004
- Recorded: House of Music, Germany
- Genres: Progressive metal, power metal
- Length: Worldwide Edition 49:23; European Edition Only 54:31
- Label: Metal Blade
- Producers: Achim Köhler, Andy B. Franck & Cedric Dupont

Symphorce chronology
| Phorceful Ahead (2002) | Twice Second (2004) | Godspeed (2005) |

Professional ratings
Review scores
| Source | Rating |
|---|---|
| Metalitalia.it | 6.5/10 |
| MetalReviews | 74/100 |
| Powermetal.de | 8/10 |
| Rock Hard | 8.5/10 |

Twice Second is an album by German heavy metal band Symphorce, released in 2004.

== Critical reception ==
Rock Hard compared the music to Vicious Rumors, Angel Dust, and early Nevermore. Metalitalia.it said it's the band's "most powerful album to date". Powermetal.de recommended the tracks "Fallen", "Whatever Hate Provides", "Searching", "Two Seconds To Live", and "Cry On My Shoulder". MetalReviews wrote: "A must listen for Nevermore and Iced Earth fans [...]".

== Track listing ==
All songs written & arranged by Franck, Dupont, Wohlbold and Pohl

1. "Fallen" - 5:54
2. "Tears" - 4:40
3. "Whatever Hate Provides" - 4:32
4. "Cause of Laughter" - 5:02
5. "In the Cold" - 3:44
6. "Take What's Mine" - 5:34
7. "Face of Pain" - 4:22
8. "Searching" - 4:26
9. "Two Seconds to Live" - 3:56
10. "Cry on My Shoulder" - 6:16
11. "Under the Curse"* - 5:08
- The European edition contains this song as a bonus track*

== Personnel ==
- Andy B. Franck – vocals
- Cedric Dupont – guitars
- Markus Pohl – guitars
- Dennis Wohlbold – bass
- Sascha Sauer – drums
