= Become Death =

Studio album by Symphorce
- Released: February 23, 2007
- Studios: House Of Music, Germany
- Genres: Heavy metal, power metal
- Length: 48:01
- Label: Metal Blade Records
- Producer: Dennis Ward

Symphorce chronology
Godspeed (2005)	Become Death (2007)	Unrestricted (2010)

Professional ratings
Review scores
Source	Rating
Metal Hammer	7/10 stars
Rock Hard	7/10 stars
Metal.de	8/10 stars
Allmusic	4.5/5 stars
Blabbermouth	7.5/10 stars
Heavymetal.dk	7/10 stars
Chronicles of Chaos	4.5/10 stars
Powermetal.de	

Become Death is the sixth studio album by the German heavy metal band Symphorce. It was the first with drummer Steffen Theurer.

== Track listing ==
1. "Darkness Fills the Sky" - 4:53
2. "Condemned" - 4:52
3. "In the Hopes of a Dream" - 5:08
4. "Death Has Come" - 5:22
5. "Inside the Cast" - 4:38
6. "No Final Words to Say" - 4:56
7. "Towards the Light" - 4:11
8. "Ancient Prophecies" - 4:59
9. "Lost but Found" - 4:14
10. "Lies" - 4:48

== Personnel ==
- Andy B. Franck - vocals
- Cedric Dupont - guitars
- Markus Pohl - guitars
- Dennis Wohlbold - bass
- Steffen Theurer - drums
