= Silver Romance =

Studio album by Freedom Call
- Released: 10 May 2024
- Recorded: November 2023
- Studios: Little Sun Creek Lounge Studio; Emperial Sound Studio
- Genre: Power metal
- Length: 52:50
- Label: Steamhammer
- Producers: Chris Bay, Lars Rettkowitz

Freedom Call chronology
M.E.T.A.L. (2019)	Silver Romance (2024)

Singles from Silver Romance
- 1. "Silver Romance" Released: 21 February 2024; 2. "In Quest of Love" Released: 20 March 2024; 3. "High Above" Released: 10 April 2024; 4. "Supernova" Released: 8 May 2024

Professional ratings
Review scores
Source	Rating
Metal Hammer Germany	5/7
Metal Hammer Italia	73/100
Metal Temple	7/10
Metal.de	7/10
Metalitalia.com	8/10
My Global Mind	9/10
New Noise Magazine	5/5
Powermetal.de	9/10
Rock Hard	7.5/10

Silver Romance is the eleventh full-length album by the German power metal band Freedom Call. It was released on 23 August 2019, by SPV. It marks the return of drummer Ramy Ali. He took a break from the band and was absent in their previous album M.E.T.A.L. due to family matters.

== Track listing ==
No.	Title	Length
1.	"Silver Romance"	4:07
2.	"Symphony of Avalon" (featuring Alessandro Conti)	4:05
3.	"Supernova"	3:55
4.	"Infinity"	4:22
5.	"Out of Space"	3:20
6.	"Distant Horizon"	4:17
7.	"In Quest of Love"	4:39
8.	"Blue Giant"	3:51
9.	"Meteorite"	3:02
10.	"Big Bang Universe"	4:36
11.	"New Haven"	3:54
12.	"High Above"	4:01
13.	"Metal Generation"	4:51
Total length:		53:00

== Personnel ==
- Chris Bay – vocals, guitar
- Lars Rettkowitz – guitar, backing vocals
- Francesco Ferraro – bass, backing vocals
- Ramy Ali – drums
