= Godspeed (Symphorce album) =

Studio album by Symphorce
- Released: 2005
- Recorded: House Of Music, Germany
- Genres: Heavy metal, power metal
- Label: Metal Blade Records
- Producers: Dennis Ward, Andy B. Franck & Cedric Dupont

Symphorce chronology
Twice Second (2004)	Godspeed (2005)	Become Death (2007)

Professional ratings
Review scores
Source	Rating
Blabbermouth	8/10
Metal.de	8/10
Powermetal.de	8/10
Rock Hard	7.5/10

Godspeed is an album by Symphorce, released in 2005.

== Track listing ==
All songs written & arranged by: Franck/Dupont/Wohlbold/Pohl

1. "Forsight" – 0:33
2. "Everlasting Life" – 4:13
3. "No Shelter" – 3:55
4. "Nowhere" – 4:39
5. "Haunting" – 3:34
6. "Black Water" – 3:41
7. "Wounds Will Last Within" – 4:10
8. "Your Cold Embrace" – 3:15
9. "Without a Trace" – 3:29
10. "The Mirrored Room" – 5:05
11. "Crawling Walls for You" – 5:12

== Reception ==
Blabbermouth wrote: "The beauty of "Godspeed" is that the band delivers a consistent hard-driven attack with catchy melodies across the board."

== Personnel ==
- Andy B. Franck – vocals
- Cedric Dupont – guitars
- Markus Pohl – guitars
- Dennis Wohlbold – bass
- Sascha Sauer – drums
