= Dimensions (Freedom Call album) =

- Cover art by Paul R. Gregory

Studio album by Freedom Call
- Released: April 20, 2007
- Recorded: July 2006 – January 2007
- Studios: FC Studios (Nuremberg) and Area 51 Studios (Celle)
- Genre: Power metal
- Length: 48:54
- Labels: SPV, King Records (Japan)
- Producer: Chris Bay

Freedom Call chronology
The Circle of Life (2005)	Dimensions (2007)	Legend of the Shadowking (2010)

Professional ratings
Review scores
Source	Rating
AllMusic	3.5/5 stars
Melodic.net	3/5 stars
Heavymetal.dk	8/10
Metal.de	8/10
Powermetal.de	Favourable
Rock Hard	6/10
Vampster	Mixed

Dimensions is the fifth full-length album by the German power metal band Freedom Call. It was released on April 20, 2007. Stylistically, the album combines the up-tempo and melodic elements of the Eternity album with the more contemporary sound of The Circle of Life album. The mixing and mastering of the album was by Tommy Newton of Victory. It is a concept album set in a post-apocalyptic world, in the year 3051, in which a demon created by mankind has completely ravaged the world. The Japanese version includes the bonus track "The Quest (Unplugged Version)".

== Reception ==
Dimensions received generally mixed reviews upon release. The more inclined towards heavy metal the reviewer was, the less favourable the review tended to be. The more mainstream the reviewer was, the more favourable the review was inclined to be. Examples would be:

Reviewing for maelstromzine.com, and giving Dimensions a 6.5/10, Roberto Martinelli wrote: "As far as children's metal goes, I don't think you can get any more exemplary than Germany's Freedom Call. Seriously, this is some of the most gay, whimsical, fruity music you're likely to ever find in the metal pantheon. If you leave a Freedom Call CD on the ground, you're likely to find a peach tree growing there before long."

Deadtide.com began its review by suggesting that: "All happy-metal-loathing punters should move on immediately. Freedom Call is the most saccharine of power metal bands, taking pride in taking galloping Euro speed metal to its most sugar-coated extreme." The review continued by suggesting: "If melody is thine enemy and wussy metal be thy bane, thou hast no greater enemy than Freedom Call."

Trucking Magazine critic Shaun Connors, with a Desert Island Disc-rating, wrote: "Having read the words power metal in the press release... and having confirmed the obvious for this genre that Dimensions was a story/concept-style album (based around the future of earth and the human race – yawn…) I feared the worst. I had visions of Richard Burton/War of the Worlds meets ecomental thrashy metal din, and on that basis Dimensions almost went directly to the bin, without passing the CD player along the way. What a mistake that would have been..." He continued: "But I'm not convinced Mr MetalHead [a previously outlined stereotype metal fan] will be happy..., and because this album is fantastic and everything I like about it, Mr MetalHead will detest. It's a bit gay, a bit sugary, more Flower Metal than Power Metal. But it's the combination of those things that make it so good. Hell, with luck and a tailwind it could even go mainstream. That said, the band would need some serious Trinny and Sussanahing before they could be seen in public."

== Track listing ==
All tracks are written by Chris Bay and Dan Zimmermann except where noted.

No.	Title	Length
1.	"Demon's Dance"	2:02
2.	"Innocent World" (Bay, Zimmermann, Rettkowitz)	4:04
3.	"United Alliance"	4:09
4.	"Mr. Evil"	3:43
5.	"The Queen Of My World"	4:26
6.	"Light Up The Sky"	5:24
7.	"Words Of Endeavour"	3:51
8.	"Blackened Sun"	4:39
9.	"Dimensions" (Bay, Zimmermann, Rettkowitz)	3:57
10.	"My Dying Paradise" (Bay, Zimmermann, Donderer)	4:46
11.	"Magic Moments" (Bay, Zimmermann, Rettkowitz)	4:34
12.	"Far Away"	3:19
Total length:		48:54

Korean bonus tracks (Taragon EP)
No.	Title	Length
13.	"Warriors Of Light"	4:11
14.	"Dancing With Tears In My Eyes" (Ultravox Cover)	3:54
15.	"Heart Of The Brave"	5:17
16.	"Hiroshima" (Wishful Thinking Cover)	4:10
17.	"Dr. Stein" (Helloween Cover)	4:48

== Personnel ==
- Chris Bay – vocals, guitar
- Lars Rettkowitz – guitar
- Armin Donderer – bass guitar
- Dan Zimmermann – drums
