= Unrestricted (Symphorce album) =

Studio album by Symphorce
- Released: October 15, 2010
- Genres: Power metal, heavy metal
- Label: AFM Records

Symphorce chronology
Become Death (2007)	Unrestricted (2010)

Unrestricted is the seventh and final studio album by German power metal band, Symphorce, released on October 15, 2010, through AFM Records.

== Track listing ==
No.	Title	Length
1.	"The Eternal"	4:08
2.	"Until It's Over"	3:46
3.	"Sorrow In Our Hearts"	3:20
4.	"Whatever Hurts"	4:41
5.	"The Waking Hour"	3:00
6.	"Visions"	4:35
7.	"The Last Decision"	3:24
8.	"The Mindless"	5:55
9.	"Worlds Seem To Collide"	3:44
10.	"Do You Ever Wonder"	4:21

== Reception ==
Professional ratings
Review scores
Source	Rating
About.com	3/5
Metal.de	7/10
Powermetal.de	7/10
Rock Hard	7/10

About.com wrote: "Unrestricted has some very good songs, some decent ones, and a couple that are filler. If you like the direction Symphorce was going with their last album, you'll enjoy their latest as well." Metal.de said the album is good despite the lack of any truly original or surprising elements.

== Personnel ==
- Markus Pohl - Guitar
- Steffen Theurer - Drums
- Cedric "Cede" Dupont - Guitar
- Dennis Wohlbold - Bass
- Andy B. Franck - Vocals
