= Phorceful Ahead =

Studio album by Symphorce
- Released: November 2002
- Recorded: House Of Music, Germany
- Genres: Heavy metal, power metal
- Length: 47:03
- Label: Metal Blade Records
- Producers: Achim Kohler, Andy B. Franck & Cedric Dupont

Symphorce chronology
Sinctuary (2000)	Phorceful Ahead (2002)	Twice Second (2004)

Professional ratings
Review scores
Source	Rating
Metalitalia.it	8/10
MetalReviews	75/100
Powermetal.de	8.5/10
Rock Hard	8.5/10

Phorceful Ahead is an album released in 2002 by the German heavy metal-band Symphorce.

== Critical reception ==
Rock Hard said Phorceful Ahead is the band's best, most structured, and heaviest album to date. Powermetal.de recommended the tracks "Speak My Mind", "Unbroken", "Slow Down", and "Moving in Circles". Metalitalia.it said the album sounds like Nevermore and Iron Maiden. MetalReviews wrote: "If your are into classical heavy metal, I suggest you to check before you buy. If you like evolution, "put an ear" on the new Symphorce."

== Track listing ==
All songs written and arranged by Franck/Dupont/Wohlbold/Pohl

1. "Speak My Mind" - 4:28
2. "Unbroken" - 4:52
3. "Slow Down" - 4:07
4. "Longing Home" - 4:44
5. "Moving in Circles" - 3:54
6. "Falling through Again" - 4:26
7. "Your Blood, My Soul" - 5:32
8. "Rage of Violence" - 6:32
9. "Touched and Infected" - 3:20
10. "Nothin' Left" - 5:08

Digipak version bonus tracks

1. "Where Night Returns" (Demo '02) - 5:25
2. "Force Fed" (Demo '02) - 5:50
3. "In Times of Grief" (Demo '02) - 5:28

== Credits ==
- Andy B. Franck - vocals
- Cedric Dupont - guitars
- Markus Pohl - guitars
- Dennis Wohlbold - bass guitar
- Sascha Sauer - drums
