= Sinctuary =

Studio album by Symphorce
- Released: 2000
- Genre: Heavy metal, power metal
- Length: 59:22
- Label: Noise Records

Symphorce chronology
Truth to Promises (1999)	Sinctuary (2000)	Phorceful Ahead (2002)

Professional ratings
Review scores
Source	Rating
Rock Hard	9/10

Sinctuary is the second full-length album by heavy/power metal band Symphorce.

== Critical reception ==
Rock Hard said the album is more intense than their debut and called the entire album flawless. Powermetal.de recommended the tracks "Holy Sin" and "Gone Too Far".

== Track listing ==
1. "Eye of Horus" - 5:34
2. "Holy Sin" - 5:57
3. "Until the Last" - 5:07
4. "Blackened Skies" - 5:29
5. "Burning Star" - 4:57
6. "Insight" - 5:01
7. "Reveal the Secrets" - 3:53
8. "Soulfly" - 4:58
9. "Nice Dreams"* - 4:20
10. "Resting Places"* - 3:34
11. "Freedom" - 5:44
12. "Gone Too Far" - 4:55
- (*)These are all bonus tracks on the limited edition.
- "Nice Dreams" is a POWERMAD cover.

== Personnel ==
- Andy B. Franck – vocals
- Cedric Dupont – guitars
- Dennis Wohlbold – bass
- Stefan Köllner – drums
- H. Peter Walter – keyboards
