= Master of Light =

Studio album by Freedom Call
- Released: November 11, 2016
- Recorded: 2016
- Genre: Power metal
- Length: 49:45, 64:00 (with bonus CD)
- Label: Steamhammer
- Producers: Chris Bay & Stephan Ernst

Freedom Call chronology
Beyond (2014)	Master of Light (2016)	M.E.T.A.L. (2019)

Professional ratings
Review scores
Source	Rating
Metal.de	8/10
Metal Hammer Germany	3/7
Metal Hammer Italia	73/100
Metalitalia.com	7/10
Powermetal.de	8.5/10
Rock Hard	6/10

Master of Light is the ninth full-length album by the German power metal band Freedom Call. It was released on November 11, 2016, by SPV.

Metal Hammer included the album cover on their list of "50 most hilariously ugly rock and metal album covers ever".

== Track listing ==
All tracks are written by Chris Bay except where noted.

No.	Title	Length
1.	"Metal Is for Everyone" (Bay, Ali)	4:52
2.	"Hammer of the Gods"	3:11
3.	"A World Beyond" (Bay, Ali)	5:55
4.	"Masters of Light" (Bay, Ali)	5:29
5.	"Kings Rise and Fall" (Rettkowitz)	4:02
6.	"Cradle of Angels" (Bay, Ali)	5:03
7.	"Emerald Skies"	3:39
8.	"Hail the Legend" (Rettkowitz)	3:58
9.	"Ghost Ballet"	3:07
10.	"Rock the Nation"	3:11
11.	"Riders in the Sky" (Rettkowitz)	4:16
12.	"High Up"	3:03
Total length:		49:45

Limited edition bonus CD (Chants of Warriors - piano versions of four Freedom Call songs)
No.	Title	Length
1.	"Beyond"	4:45
2.	"Paladin"	3:35
3.	"Emerald Skies"	3:35
4.	"Hymn to the Brave"	3:20
Total length:		14:15

== Personnel ==
- Chris Bay – vocals, guitar
- Lars Rettkowitz – rhythm guitar
- Ilker Ersin – bass guitar
- Ramy Ali – drums
