= Crystal Empire =

Studio album by Freedom Call
- Released: 22 January 2001
- Recorded: June–December 2000
- Studios: Hansen Studion in Hamburg, Karo Studio in Brackel, C.C.C. Studios in Bräuningshof and FC Studios in Nürnberg
- Genre: Power metal
- Length: 48:38
- Label: Steamhammer
- Producers: Charlie Bauerfeind, Chris Bay, Dan Zimmermann

Freedom Call chronology
Stairway to Fairyland (1999)	Crystal Empire (2001)	Eternity (2002)

Professional ratings
Review scores
Source	Rating
AllMusic	2.5/5 stars
Chronicles of Chaos	8/10
Metal Temple	7/10
Metal.de	10/10
Powermetal.de	Favourable
Rock Hard	8/10
Soundi	3/5 stars
Vampster	Favourable

Crystal Empire is the second full-length album by the German power metal band Freedom Call. It was released on 22 January 2001 by Steamhammer. It was the last Freedom Call album with Sascha Gerstner prior to him joining Helloween.

== Track listing ==
All tracks are written by Chris Bay and Dan Zimmermann.

No.	Title	Length
1.	"The King of the Crystal Empire"	0:32
2.	"Freedom Call"	5:19
3.	"Rise Up"	4:05
4.	"Farewell"	3:49
5.	"Pharao"	4:43
6.	"Call of Fame"	4:15
7.	"Heart of the Rainbow"	4:36
8.	"The Quest"	7:35
9.	"Ocean"	5:10
10.	"Palace of Fantasy"	4:48
11.	"The Wanderer"	3:46
Total length:		48:38

== Personnel ==
- Chris Bay – vocals, guitar, keyboards
- Sascha Gerstner – guitar
- Ilker Ersin – bass guitar
- Dan Zimmermann – drums
- Rolf Kholer, Olaf Senkbeil, Janie Dixon, Mitch Schmitt – choir (guests)
- Stefan Heimer – bass guitar on tracks 4, 6, 7 and 9 (guest)
