= The Circle of Life (album) =

Studio album by Freedom Call
- Released: 21 May 2005
- Recorded: August–October 2004
- Studios: Hansen Studio in Hamburg; FC Studios in Nuremberg
- Genre: Power metal
- Length: 50:57
- Label: Steamhammer
- Producers: Chris Bay, Dan Zimmerman

Freedom Call chronology
Eternity (2002)	The Circle of Life (2005)	Dimensions (2007)

Professional ratings
Review scores
Source	Rating
AllMusic	3/5 stars
Heavymetal.dk	8/10
Metal.de	3/10
Metalitalia.com	7/10
Powermetal.de	Favourable
Rock Hard	4/10
Vampster	Favourable

The Circle of Life is the fourth full-length album by the German power metal band Freedom Call. It was released on 21 May 2005 by SPV.

== Track listing ==
All tracks are written by Chris Bay and Dan Zimmermann except where noted.

No.	Title	Length
1.	"Mother Earth"	4:32
2.	"Carry On"	3:31
3.	"The Rhythm Of Life"	3:41
4.	"Hunting High And Low" (Bay, Zimmermann, Dupont)	4:02
5.	"Starlight"	3:44
6.	"The Gathering"	1:23
7.	"Kings And Queens"	3:47
8.	"Hero Nation"	4:56
9.	"High Enough" (Bay, Zimmermann, Dupont)	5:53
10.	"Starchild"	5:11
11.	"The Eternal Flame"	4:25
12.	"The Circle Of Life"	5:52
Total length:		50:57

== Personnel ==
- Chris Bay – vocals, guitar, keyboards
- Cédric Dupont – guitar
- Ilker Ersin – bass guitar
- Nils Neumann – keyboards
- Dan Zimmermann – drums
