= Legend of the Shadowking =

Studio album by Freedom Call
- Released: 1 February 2010
- Recorded: October 2009 – January 2010
- Studios: FC Studio in Nürnberg and AREA 51 Studio in Celle
- Genre: Power metal
- Length: 56:36
- Label: SPV
- Producers: Chris Bay, Dan Zimmermann

Freedom Call chronology
Dimensions (2007)	Legend of the Shadowking (2010)	Land of the Crimson Dawn (2012)

Professional ratings
Review scores
Source	Rating
AllMusic	3.5/5 stars
Soundi	3/5 stars
Imperiumi	9.5/10
Metal Express Radio	8/10
Metalitalia.com	7/10
Powermetal.de	8.5/10
Rock Hard	7/10

Legend of the Shadowking is the sixth full-length album by the German power metal band Freedom Call. It was released on 1 February 2010 via SPV.

== Track listing ==
All tracks are written by Chris Bay and Dan Zimmermann except where noted.

No.	Title	Length
1.	"Out of the Ruins" (Rettkowitz)	4:21
2.	"Thunder God"	3:30
3.	"Tears of Babylon"	3:38
4.	"Merlin – Legend of the Past"	4:16
5.	"Resurrection Day" (Rettkowitz)	3:33
6.	"Under the Spell of the Moon"	5:08
7.	"Dark Obsession"	4:44
8.	"The Darkness"	5:05
9.	"Remember!" (Bay, Zimmermann, Rettkowitz)	4:21
10.	"Ludwig II – Prologue"	2:18
11.	"The Shadowking"	5:12
12.	"Merlin – Requiem"	2:34
13.	"Kingdom of Madness"	3:59
14.	"A Perfect Day"	3:57
Total length:		56:36

Japanese edition
No.	Title	Length
15.	"Zauber Der Nacht" (German version of "Under the Spell of the Moon")	3:26

== Personnel ==
- Chris Bay – vocals, guitar
- Lars Rettkowitz – guitar
- Samy Saemann – bass guitar
- Dan Zimmermann – drums
