= Land of the Crimson Dawn =

Studio album by Freedom Call
- Released: February 24, 2012
- Recorded: September 11 – November 15, 2011
- Studios: Separate Sound Studio and FC Studio in Nürnberg
- Genres: Heavy metal, power metal
- Length: 61:18
- Label: SPV
- Producers: Chris Bay & Stephan Ernst

Freedom Call chronology
Legend of the Shadowking (2010)	Land of the Crimson Dawn (2012)	Ages of Light (2013)

Professional ratings
Review scores
Source	Rating
Aux Portes Du Metal	18/20
Imperiumi	7.5/10
Louder Sound	3/5
Metal Express Radio	6/10
Metalfan.nl	82/100
Metalitalia.com	7/10
Metal.de	7/10
Powermetal.de	8.5/10
Rock Hard	6.5/10

Land of the Crimson Dawn is the seventh full-length album by the German power metal band Freedom Call. It was released on February 24, 2012, via SPV in Germany, the Europe-wide release on February 27, and the North American release on February 28. The album was released in three versions: as a jewel case featuring 14 songs, as a double coloured vinyl LP and as a limited edition double CD digipak including six additional Freedom Call covers.

== Track listing ==
All tracks are written by Chris Bay, except tracks 1 and 11 music and lyrics by Lars Rettkowitz and track 13: music and lyrics by Samy Saemann.

No.	Title	Length
1.	"Age of the Phoenix"	3:25
2.	"Rockstars"	4:57
3.	"Crimson Dawn"	6:03
4.	"66 Warriors"	5:17
5.	"Back Into the Land of Light"	5:11
6.	"Sun in the Dark"	4:42
7.	"Hero On Video"	3:42
8.	"Valley of Kingdom"	4:11
9.	"Killer Gear"	4:32
10.	"Rockin' Radio"	4:03
11.	"Terra Liberty"	3:40
12.	"Eternity"	4:17
13.	"Space Legends"	3:53
14.	"Power & Glory"	3:25
Total length:		61:18

Limited Edition Bonus CD
No.	Title	Length
1.	"Flame In The Night" (Powerworld, DE)	5:01
2.	"Hunting High And Low" (Downspirit, DE)	3:21
3.	"Fairyland" (Secret Sphere, IT)	5:14
4.	"Palace Of Fantasy" (Manimal, SE)	4:55
5.	"Land Of Light" (Neonfly, UK)	3:51
6.	"Warriors" (Hannes Braun/Kissing Dynamite, DE)	3:21
Total length:		25:43

== Personnel ==
- Chris Bay – vocals, guitar, keyboards
- Lars Rettkowitz – guitar, backing vocals
- Samy Saemann – bass guitar, backing vocals
- Klaus Sperling – drums, backing vocals
