= Eternity (Freedom Call album) =

Studio album by Freedom Call
- Released: 3 June 2002
- Recorded: January–March 2002
- Studios: FC Studios, Nürnberg
- Genre: Power metal
- Length: 47:57
- Label: Steamhammer
- Producer: Chris Bay

Freedom Call chronology
Crystal Empire (2001)	Eternity (2002)	The Circle of Life (2004)

Professional ratings
Review scores
Source	Rating
AllMusic	2.5/5 stars
Chronicles of Chaos	4/10
Imperiumi	9/10
Metal.de	8/10
Metal Express Radio	Favourable
Metalitalia.com	5/10
Powermetal.de	Favourable
Rock Hard	8.5/10
Vampster	Very unfavourable

Eternity is the third full-length album by the German power metal band Freedom Call. It was released on 3 June 2002 by Steamhammer.

== Track listing ==
All tracks are written by Chris Bay and Dan Zimmermann except where noted.

No.	Title	Length
1.	"Metal Invasion"	6:49
2.	"Flying High"	4:09
3.	"Ages of Power"	4:41
4.	"The Spell"	0:54
5.	"Bleeding Heart"	4:58
6.	"Warriors"	4:20
7.	"The Eyes Of The World"	3:55
8.	"Flame In The Night" (Bay, Zimmermann, Ersin)	4:57
9.	"Land Of Light"	3:54
10.	"Island Of Dreams"	4:16
11.	"Turn Back Time"	5:04
Total length:		47:57

== Personnel ==
- Chris Bay – vocals, guitar, keyboards
- Cedric Dupont – guitar
- Ilker Ersin – bass guitar
- Dan Zimmermann – drums
